= Culture Collection =

Culture Collection may refer to:

- Culture Collection, University of Gothenburg, Sweden
- Culture Collection of the Catholic University of Pernambuco

== See also ==
- Microbiological culture
- World Federation for Culture Collections
- Microbial Culture Collection, Pune, India
- European Culture Collections' Organisation
- SERI microalgae culture collection
- American Type Culture Collection
- HPA Culture Collections
- ARS Culture Collection (NRRL)
