= Microbial Culture Collection =

Microbial culture collection in Pune, India

The Microbial Culture Collection (now called the National Centre for Microbial Resource, NCMR) is a microbial culture collection centre in Pune, India. The facility acts as a national depository, supplying authentic microbial cultures and providing related services to research institutions, universities, industries and the scientific community in general. It is funded by the Department of Biotechnology.

The MCC is affiliated to the National Centre for Cell Science. It is also an affiliate member of the World Federation for Culture Collections and is registered with the World Data Centre for Microorganisms under registration number 930.

The MCC has a status of International Depositary Authority, certified in April 2011 by the World Intellectual Property Organization in Switzerland, as well as by the World Federation for Culture Collections. The deposit of microorganisms is recognized under the Budapest Treaty to fulfill the requirement of patent procedure in 55 member countries.

The MCC scientists are actively involved in the research programmes relating to microbial diversity, metagenomics, ecology and taxonomy, using both classical and molecular approaches.

== Objectives ==
- Isolation and identification of microorganisms from various environmental niches.
- Preservation of microbial biodiversity from niche areas as metagenomic libraries.
- Development of new strategies for isolation of "not yet cultured" microbes.
- To provide consultation services for patent deposits, preservation, propagation, bio-deterioration, industrial problems, biosystematics and microbial biodiversity issues etc.
- To establish and conduct workshops, seminars, symposia and training programmes in the area of microbial identification, preservation and advanced areas of microbial taxonomy and phylogeny.

== See also ==
- European Culture Collections' Organisation, Denmark
- German Resource Centre for Biological Material (DSMZ), Germany
- Culture Collection, University of Göteborg, Sweden
- American Type Culture Collection, United States
- Japan Collection of Microorganisms, Japan
- World Federation for Culture Collections
