= Aerococcus vaginalis =

Scientific classification
- Domain: Bacteria
- Kingdom: Bacillati
- Phylum: Bacillota
- Class: Bacilli
- Order: Lactobacillales
- Family: Aerococcaceae
- Genus: Aerococcus
- Species: A. vaginalis

Binomial name
- Aerococcus vaginalis Tohno et al. 2014

Type strain
- BV2^{T} (= JCM 19163, DSM 27293)

Gram positive bacterium

Aerococcus vaginalis is a gram-positive bacterium that is found in clusters of cocci. It was originally isolated from the vaginal mucosa of beef cows in Japan in 2014.

== Characteristics ==
The colonies lack pigmentation and are circular, and it is a facultative anaerobe. Aerococcus vaginalis is catalase negative, alkaline phosphatase positive, and acid phosphatase positive. It ferments the carbohydrates D-glucose, D-galactose, D-fructose, D-ribose, D-mannose, D-tagatose, maltose, and N-acetylglucosamine.
