= Spanish Bank of Algae =

National R&D service organization

- Location within Gran Canaria Location within Canary Islands Location within Africa
- Abbreviation: BEA
- Type: Scientific Research
- Coordinates: 27°59′28″N 15°22′8″W
- Region served: International
- Key people: Guillermo García-Blairsy Reina (Executive Director) and Bruno Berheide (Manager)
- Website: http://bea.marinebiotechnology.org/

The Spanish Bank of Algae (BEA-Banco Español de Algas) is a national R&D service attached to the Marine Biotechnology Center (CBM-Centro de Biotecnología Marina) of the University of Las Palmas de Gran Canaria (ULPGC), which objectives are the isolation, identification, characterization, conservation and provisioning of microalgae and cyanobacteria. It was previously known as the National Bank of Algae (BNA).

== Introduction ==
In addition to the functions of isolation, identification, characterization, conservation and provisioning, standard in any collection of microorganisms, the CBM-BEA/ULPGC aims to function as a service facilitating the development of a new bioindustrial sector based on the cultivation and application of microalgae.

BEA has been member of the European Culture Collection Organization (ECCO) since 2001 and of the World Federation for Culture Collections (WFCC) since 2003. BEA is listed in the World Data Centre for Microorganisms (WFCC-MIRCEN) under registration number 837.

BEA is Accredited as an International Authority for the Deposit of Micro-organisms in accordance with the Treaty of Budapest by the World Intellectual Property Organization (WIPO), resolution No. 239 of 28 October 2005 before the Government of Spain. This accreditation confers on BEA the deposit of algae for the purposes of recognition of industrial property before the World Intellectual Property Office and the Spanish Patent and Trademark Office.

BEA holds strains from tropical and subtropical areas, in particular of the Macaronesian Region. These cultures have strain numbers preceded by BEA. Non-axenic cultures are marked with "B" at the end of the strain number.

== History ==
1985.- The embryo of the Group of Applied Algology, from the former Polytechnic University of the Canaries, started up with the motto "sun and seawater can grow more than tourists." 1995.- The Center of Applied Algology -ULPGC (now the CBM-ULPGC) created a collection of microalgae in 1995 thanks to a generous donation from Dr. Ziiadine Ramazanov (scientist in the former USSR at the Soviet Academy of Science’s Institute of Plant Physiology and Astrobiology, who worked in the IAA in 1995–96), who gave his personal collection of microalgae to the IAA, thus helping to introduce the group to the field of biotechnology of microalgae. Before that date, the applied phycology group had only worked with macroalgae in the fields of in vitro cultures, population genetics and intensive cultures. 1996.- The CBM-BNA lost most of its microalga collection due to a 5-month electrical outage. Dr. Ramazanov emigrated to the United States, published several books and created a plant biotechnology company. 1998.- The paperwork was started to obtain WIPO accreditation for the BEA as an International Depositary Authority pursuant to the Budapest Treaty. The OEPM (Spanish Patent and Trademark Office) and the Spanish Type Culture Collection (University of Valencia) cooperated with this institution to achieve international accreditation for the BEA, a process that lasted until 2005. 1999.- Letter of support from the Council for Scientific Research (Dr. Miguel García Guerrero, CSIC-MEC) to consolidate the BNA (after an inspection visit to the facilities of what was then called the Centro de Algología Aplicada (Applied Phycology Center) – ULPGC). Letter of support was sent from the Spanish Phycology Society to consolidate the BNA (after an inspection visit to the facilities of what was then called the Centro de Algología Aplicada (Applied Phycology Center) – ULPGC).

The Board of the ULPGC signed an agreement to break up the CBM-BNA. Following arduous litigation, which ended in 2003 with the final ruling from Spain’s Constitutional Court, the CBM-BNA was left intact.

2000.- The BNA was accepted as a member of the ECCO (European Culture Collection Organization).

2001.- Spain’s Parliament (Draft Law 161/000706 of 30 April 2001-Series D, No. 170) urged the government to establish the National Bank of Algae at the ULPGC’s Applied Phycology Center and to accredit it as an International Depositary Authority pursuant to the Budapest Treaty.

2003.- The BNA became a member of the World Federation for Culture Collections (WFCC) and received registration number 837 in the WFCC-MIRCEN World Data Center for Microorganisms.

The ULPGC endorsed CBM’s bylaws, which defined the BNA as one of the two Services (the other being Flow Cytometry) offered by the Centro de Biotecnología Marina (Marine Biotechnology Center) – ULPGC. CBM and BEA are finally recognized by the ULPGC.

2004.- Spain’s Ministry of Education and Science (MEC) awards the first and only financial grant conceded to the BEA prior to 2010 (every other local, regional and national grant request was rejected) through its 2003–2006 Complementary Actions aid program.

The BNA collaborates in the first study of oceanic toxic algal blooms in the Canary Islands (summer 2004), commissioned by the Government of the Canaries Council on Agriculture, Fishing and Food. Resulting from this effort was the paper "Novel Bloom of Trichodesmium erythraeum in the NW African Upwelling". The year before the CBM-BNA had warned of the risk of toxic microalgal Aphanizomenon spp blooms in reservoirs on the island of Grand Canary. When the bloom of toxic cyanobacteria became evident three months later, the drainage basin had to be closed off and irrigation suspended. There are certified reports of hospitalizations in the Canaries due to the consumption of fish containing microalgal toxins. The risks of HAB (Harmful Algal Blooms) and their increased incidence due to climate change started to be taken seriously by government officials.

2005.- BNA was accredited as an International Depositary Authority for the purposes of patent procedure. The complex process to accredit the BNA/CBM as an International Depositary Authority (for patent purposes) pursuant to the Budapest Treaty successfully culminated on 28 October 2005 with the publication of its accreditation in the WIPO (World Intellectual Property Organization) Official Bulletin (Budapest Notification No. 239).

BNA organized the Tropical and Subtropical Cyanoprokaryota Workshop 2005 (TSCW2005), in cooperation with Proexca, the Industry Council of Grand Canary, Caja Rural de Canarias Foundation, La Caixa, the ULPGC Board, the Ocean Sciences Department of the ULPGC and the spin-off company Seaweed Canarias.

2007.- The MEC provided funds for staffing one Scientific-Technological Infrastructure Specialist at the National Bank of Algae (BNA).

2009.- The Minister of Science and Innovation, Dr. Cristina Garmendia, announced the consolidation of the BNA-CBM. “The BNA will serve as a national research service to promote microalgae-based bio-industries, it will create and maintain its own collection, taking advantage of Spanish oceanographic expeditions, and it will provide samples to laboratories and companies that so request them for study and eventual technical applications”.

In late 2009, the Government of Spain (Ministry of Innovation and Science [MICINN]) finalized a 2.6 M€ grant for the consolidation of the BNA (23 July 2009), as part of the PLAN-E microalgae project.

CBM is included in the Canaries Marine Development Complex, located in Taliarte (SE coast of Grand Canary), and the emerging BNA backs the joint request made to the MICINN by the ULPGC and the University of La Laguna (ULL) to classify the Tricontinental Campus as a “campus of excellence”.

2010.- In March 2010, contracts were finalized and remodeling work had begun on the CBM-BNA laboratories as part of a Plan-E Project, which was initially scheduled for completion in December 2010, though the deadline was later extended until December 2011. The remodeling work (the deadline extension was not implemented) was completed on 16 December (the scientific work of the CBM-BNA did not stop in 2010, since every available inch of the laboratories on the ground floor and the second floor hallways were turned into offices, classrooms and bathrooms ). Doctors Michael Melkonian and Barbara Melkonian (University of Cologne, Germany) made a sabbatical stay (September 2010 to March 2011) at BNA.

2011.- By February growth chambers, equipments and basic microalgae cultivation systems were operating. In May the organization was officially renamed to Spanish Bank of Algae (BEA). On 2 June, the authorisation to publish the BEA website was granted, which includes catalogs of products and services.

== Products ==
- Strains: Main Catalog, Axenic Strains, gDNA Strains, and Sequenced DNA Strains.
- Genomic DNA: BEA offers aliquots of genomic DNA from most of its strains. Genomic DNA is extracted and purified in the Molecular Biology Unit of the Marine Biotechnology Center, ULPGC, using commercially available kits. The concentration and purity of DNA samples are determined by spectroscopy (NanoDrop2000, ThermoFisher), gel electrophoresis, PCR amplification and sequencing of rRNA operon fragments. Genomic DNA is supplied as 25 μl aliquots with a concentration of 50 ng/μl .
- Culture Media and Seawater: All media used by BEA are available for purchase.

== Services ==
- Strain identification by microscopy: BEA performs microscopy analyses for algal strain identification.
- Strain identification by DNA analysis: BEA performs genomic DNA sequencing analyses for algal strain identification.
- gDNA “à la carte”: BEA is able to extract genomic DNA from microalgae cultures from a wide range of volumes. Normally kits (i.e. Macherey-Nagel and Qiagen) are used for routine extractions of genomic DNA.
- Strain isolation and purification: Custom isolation of cyanobacteria and microalgae from fresh field samples or other sources. BEA can offer different methods for isolating strains, from traditional manual isolation to flow cytometric cell sorting.
