= Dasilva =

Dasilva or DaSilva is a surname. Notable people with the surname include:

- Dan DaSilva (born 1985), Canadian ice hockey player
- Edgar J DaSilva (1941–2007), Indian microbiologist
- Jason DaSilva (born 1978), American documentary filmmaker
- Jay Dasilva (born 1998), Welsh footballer
- Jon DaSilva, British record producer and DJ
- Josh Dasilva (born 1998), English footballer
- Marcos "Barrão" DaSilva (born 1961), Brazilian capoeira mestre
- Raúl daSilva (born 1993), American filmmaker
- Vicki DaSilva (born c. 1960), American artist

== See also ==
- Da Silva
