= Bea =

Bea or BEA, as a name, abbreviation, or acronym, may refer to:

== Companies and organisations ==
- Bank of East Asia
- BEA Systems, an American software company
- Belgian Entertainment Association, a music, video and video game industry organization
- Black Economic Alliance
- British European Airways
- Broadcast Education Association, an international organization of media communication scholars
- Spanish Bank of Algae (Banco Español de Algas), a national research and development service

== Government agencies ==
- British Electricity Authority
- Bureau d'Enquêtes et d'Analyses pour la Sécurité de l'Aviation Civile, the French agency responsible for investigating aviation accidents
- Bureau d'Enquête et d'Analyse pour la sécurité de l'aviation civile (Senegal), the Senegalese agency responsible for investigating aviation accidents
- Bureau of Economic Analysis, an agency of the United States Department of Commerce
- New Hampshire Department of Business and Economic Affairs, an agency of the U.S. state of New Hampshire

== People ==
- Bea (given name)
- Bea (surname)

== Arts, entertainment, and media ==
- Bea, character from the Supercell game Brawl Stars
- Beabadoobee, Filipino-British singer-songwriter

== Other uses ==
- Bea, Aragon, a municipality in the province of Teruel, Aragon, Spain
- Bail Enforcement Agent, a bounty hunter
- Bea or Aka-Bea language, an Asian extinct language
- Bile esculin agar, a growth medium
- BookExpo America, a major book fair in the United States

== See also ==
- Beas (disambiguation)
- Beatrix (disambiguation)
- Beatrice (disambiguation)
- Bee (disambiguation)
