= Mycobacterium chubuense =

Scientific classification
- Domain: Bacteria
- Kingdom: Bacillati
- Phylum: Actinomycetota
- Class: Actinomycetia
- Order: Mycobacteriales
- Family: Mycobacteriaceae
- Genus: Mycobacterium
- Species: M. chubuense

Binomial name
- Mycobacterium chubuense Tsukamura 1981, ATCC 27278

Species of bacterium

Mycobacterium chubuense is a species of the phylum Actinomycetota (Gram-positive bacteria with high guanine and cytosine content, one of the dominant phyla of all bacteria), belonging to the genus Mycobacterium.

Type strain: strain 48013 (previously, strain 5517) = ATCC 27278 = CCUG 37670 = CIP 106810 = DSM 44219 = JCM 6374 = NCTC 10819.
