= Sora Park Tanjasiri =

Public health researcher

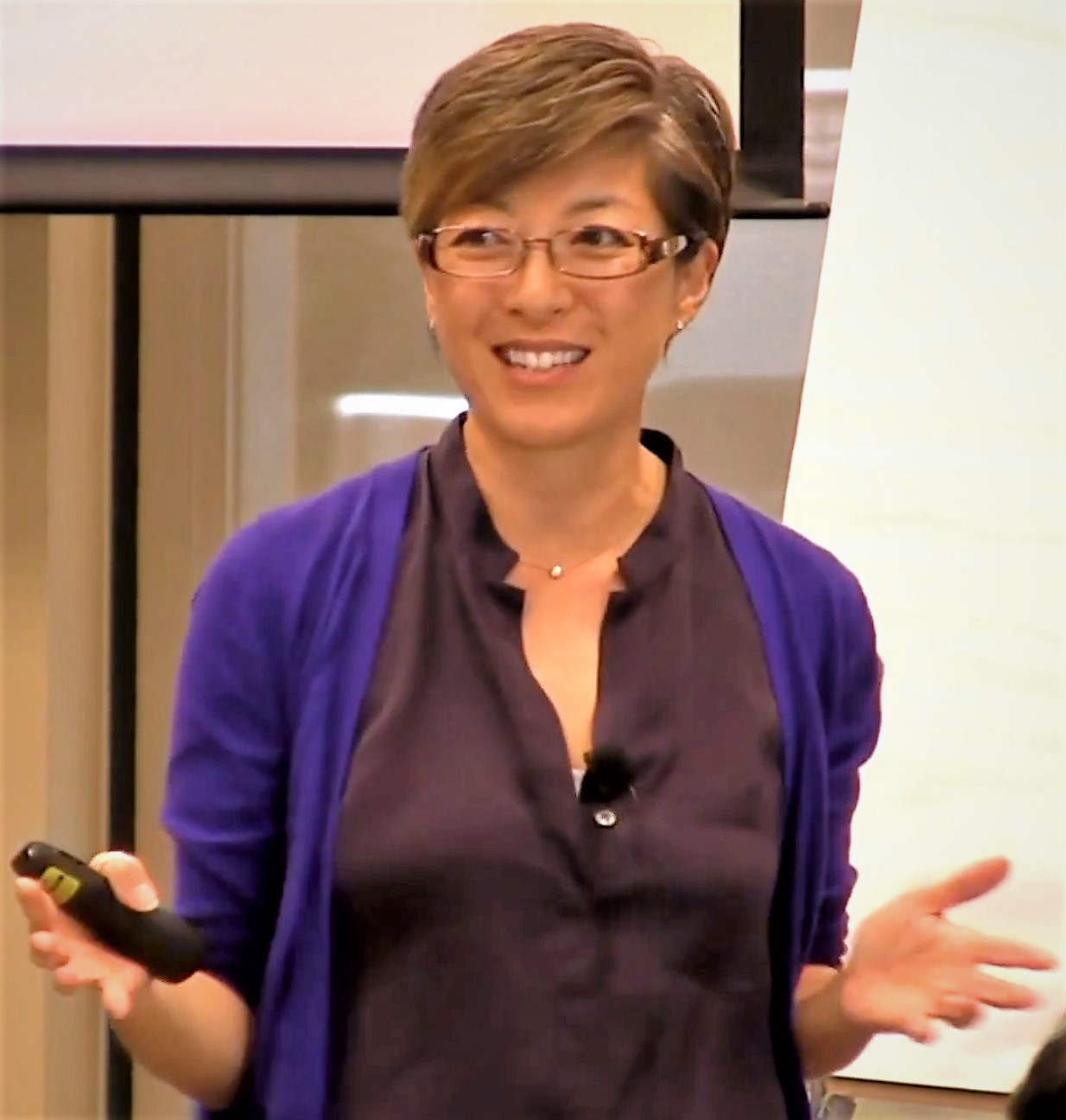
- Tanjasiri speaks at UC Irvine in 2012
- Education: University of California, Berkeley (BSc); University of California, Los Angeles (MPH, PhD)
- Known for: Community health
- Scientific career
- Workplaces: California State University, Fullerton; University of California, Irvine
- Thesis: Acting locally: Factors promoting Asian Pacific Islander agency participation in collaborative tobacco policy advocacy (1996)

Sora Park Tanjasiri (born 1964) is a professor in the Department of Epidemiology at the University of California, Irvine, and Associate Director for Cancer Health Disparities and Community Engagement at the UCI Chao Family Comprehensive Cancer Center. Her research focuses on community health in diverse populations, in particular Pacific Islanders and Asian Americans.

== Early life and education ==
Tanjasiri earned her undergraduate degree at the University of California, Berkeley. She moved to the University of California, Los Angeles, for her graduate studies, where she earned a Master of Public Health and a doctorate. Tanjasiri acted as an advisor for the California Tobacco Control Program from 1992. After earning her doctorate Tanjasiri joined the University of California, Irvine, where she completed postdoctoral research in the Department of Environmental Analysis & Design. She was a founding member of the National Asian Pacific American Women's Forum in 1996, Orange County Asian Pacific Islander Community Alliance in 1997, and Orange County Women's Health Project in 2011.

== Research and career ==
Tanjasiri joined California State University, Fullerton, in 2003. She was promoted to Professor in 2008, where she was the founding director of the Center for Cancer Disparities Research. In 2010 she was made Director of the Health Promotion Research Institute and in 2014 Chair in the Department of Health Science.

In 2005 Tanjasiri launched the research project WINCART (Weaving an Islander Network for Awareness, Research and Training), which looks to improve the health of underserved populations. The early stages of WINCART involved building a network of Pacific Islander community groups and local universities. Tanjasiri has worked to better represent people from underserved communities in biorepositories, as, despite being important in the diagnosis of cancer, Alzheimer's disease and other diseases, biorepositories typically exclude Pacific Islanders. Pacific Islanders are often hesitant to donate to biorepositories because of distrust in public health systems, but their exclusion from these databases can have negative impacts on their health and wellbeing. They suffer from higher rates of tobacco use and obesity and lower levels of early cancer detection. WINCART has been supported by the National Institutes of Health, and was most recently awarded $1.5 million from the National Cancer Institute, which has funded Tanjasiri in teaching the Pacific Islander community about cancer research and detection. She has led screening programs for the Chamorro, Marshallese and Samoans who live in Orange County, California.

At California State University, Fullerton, Tanjasiri has looked to support medical students from minority groups through mentorship and structured programs. Alongside her academic research in health disparities, Tanjasiri has studied the scholarly outcomes of minority medical students. She was awarded the 2012 Outstanding Professor Award from the California State University, Fullerton, the 2013 Champions of Health Professions Diversity Award from the California Wellness Foundation, and 2015 California State University Wang Family Excellence Awards.

In 2018, Tanjasiri moved to the University of California, Irvine, as Professor of Epidemiology and Associate Director for Cancer Health Disparities and Community Engagement. She also continues to volunteer and advise several state, regional and national organizations including the California Dialogue on Cancer, Robert Wood Johnson Foundation's Health Policy Research Scholars Program, National Cancer Institute's Geographical Management of Cancer Health Disparities Program, and the National Institutes of Health Center for Scientific Review.

== Personal life ==
Tanjasiri is married with two children.
