= BCCM =

BCCM may refer to:

- Basel Christian Church of Malaysia
- Belgian Co-ordinated Collections of Micro-organisms
- British Columbia Conservatory of Music
