= Mycobacterium chitae =

Scientific classification
- Domain: Bacteria
- Kingdom: Bacillati
- Phylum: Actinomycetota
- Class: Actinomycetia
- Order: Mycobacteriales
- Family: Mycobacteriaceae
- Genus: Mycobacterium
- Species: M. chitae

Binomial name
- Mycobacterium chitae Tsukamura 1967, ATCC 19627

Species of bacterium

Mycobacterium chitae is a species of the phylum Actinomycetota (Gram-positive bacteria with high guanine and cytosine content, one of the dominant phyla of all bacteria), belonging to the genus Mycobacterium.

Type strain: strain ATCC 19627 = CCUG 39504 = CIP 105383 = DSM 44633 = JCM 12403 = NCTC 10485.
