= Edgar J DaSilva =

Indian microbiologist (1941–2007)

Edgar J. DaSilva (21 August 1941 – 28 October 2007) was an Indian microbiologist who advanced biotechnology research and training. DaSilva joined the United Nations Educational, Scientific and Cultural Organization (UNESCO) in 1974 and became the head of its life sciences section, where he identified scientific priorities for UNESCO's programs.

== Career ==
DaSilva planned and implemented UNESCO regional and international programmes in applied microbiology and biotechnology as well in the development of global networks dealing with the management and use of microbial resources and training opportunities in the fields of marine and plant biotechnology. He was a co-founder of the Microbiological Resource Centres (MIRCEN) and helped establish the Biotechnology Action Countil (BAC).

DaSilva worked on international programs for co-ordinated action on topics of common interest. He supported the International Organization of Biotechnology and Bioengineering (IOBB), built links with the World Federation for Culture Collections (WFCC), and contributed to conferences on the Global Impact of Applied Microbiology (GIAM). He mobilized several extra-budgetary programs in cooperation with UNEP and UNDP and donor member states for activities in national development in biotechnology and regional cooperation in microbiology.

During his time with UNESCO, DaSilva continued teaching in his own area of specialization of microbiology and also in biotechnology. He contributed to the development of training initiatives and set up fellowship and professorship programs to stimulate scientific exchange. He was a strong proponent of international scientific collaboration as a means to promote development and aid provide developing countries with the tools to drive their own scientific research.

He was co-editor of the "Biotechnology" theme for the UNESCO-sponsored Encyclopedia of Life Support Systems (EOLSS).

DaSilva died in Mumbai, India.
