= International Code of Nomenclature of Prokaryotes =

Code of nomenclature

The International Code of Nomenclature of Prokaryotes (ICNP) or Prokaryotic Code, formerly the International Code of Nomenclature of Bacteria (ICNB) or Bacteriological Code (BC), governs the scientific names for Bacteria and Archaea. It denotes the rules for naming taxa of bacteria, according to their relative rank. As such it is one of the nomenclature codes of biology.

Originally the International Code of Botanical Nomenclature dealt with bacteria, and this kept references to bacteria until these were eliminated at the 1975 International Botanical Congress. An early Code for the nomenclature of bacteria was approved at the 4th International Congress for Microbiology in 1947, but was later discarded.

The latest version to be printed in book form is the 1990 Revision, but the book does not represent the current rules. The 2008, 2022 and 2025 revisions have been published in the International Journal of Systematic and Evolutionary Microbiology (IJSEM). Rules are maintained by the International Committee on Systematics of Prokaryotes (ICSP; formerly the International Committee on Systematic Bacteriology, ICSB). Its Judicial Commission decides on matters such as the conservation and rejection of prokaryotic names and issues guidelines on using the ICNP.

The baseline for bacterial names is the Approved Lists with a starting point of 1980. New bacterial names are reviewed by the ICSP as being in conformity with the Rules of Nomenclature and published in the IJSEM, either in an effective publication or in a Validation List.

== Cyanobacteria ==
Since 1975, most bacteria were covered under the bacteriological code. However, cyanobacteria were still covered by the botanical code. Starting in 1999, cyanobacteria were covered by both the botanical and bacteriological codes. This situation has caused nomenclatural problems for the cyanobacteria. By 2020, there were three proposals for how to resolve the situation:

1. Exclude cyanobacteria from the bacteriological code.
2. Apply the bacteriological code to all cyanobacteria.
3. Treat valid publication under the botanical code as valid publication under the bacteriological code.

In 2021, the ICSP held a formal vote on the three proposals and the third option was chosen.

== Type strain ==
Since 2001, when a new bacterial or archaeal species is described, a type strain must be designated. The type strain is a living culture to which the scientific name of that organism is formally attached. For a new species name to be validly published, the type strain must be deposited in a public culture collection in at least two different countries. Before 2001, a species could also be typified using a description, a preserved specimen, or an illustration. There is a single type strain for each prokaryotic species, but different culture collections may designate a unique name for the same strain. For example, the type strain of E. coli (originally strain U5/41) is called ATCC 11775 by the American Type Culture Collection, DSM 30083 by the German Collection of Microorganisms and Cell Cultures, JCM 1649 by the Japan Collection of Microorganisms, and LMG 2092 by the Belgian Coordinated Collections of Microorganisms.

When a prokaryotic species cannot be cultivated in the laboratory (and therefore cannot be deposited in a culture collection), it may be given a provisional Candidatus name, but is not considered validly published. Since 2024, these names can be "pro-validly published" and become "pro-legitimate" and "pro-correct". This requires the name to meet most existing requirements for valid publication (and analogously for legitimacy and correctness), except the culture deposition in Rule 30 can be replaced by a living culture not meeting the requirements of Rule 30, a preserved specimen, a sequenced genome deposited on the INSDC, or a single-gene sequence deposited to the INSDC. Pro-legitimate Candidatus names compete with each other for pro-priority, but do not compete with validly published and legitimate names for priority.

An earlier proposal to accept names based on sequences alone as validly published was rejected by the ICSP with a clear majority. In conflict with this decision, a separate code that allows for "valid publication" of names that the ICNP considers Candidatus names, the Code of Nomenclature of Prokaryotes Described from Sequence Data (SeqCode), was published in 2022, which is supported by the International Society for Microbial Ecology, an organization separate from the ICSP. The SeqCode is not recognized by the ICSP or the ICNP.

== Other notable differences from the Botanical Code ==
Notable differences in rules:

- Hyphenation is not allowed. Previously hyphenated names and new compounds are to be simply joined.
- Diacritics are not allowed. There are fixed two-letter replacements for some letters with diacritics. There is no clarifying carve-out for diaeresis (ë) like in Rule 60.7 of the Shenzhen Code.

Notable differences in recommended practice:

- Scientific names are recommended to be differentiated "by a different type face, e.g., italic, or by some other device". Italicization is not mandatory.
  - There are no rank-specific rules for italicization in the ICNP. While many publishers choose to italicize genera and species only, the affiliated IJSEM and the ICNP text itself italicize all scientific names (with the exception of Candidatus-specific formatting).
  - Latin words or abbreviations that follow an italicized scientific name should not be italicized. They may be laid out in roman (regular) font, or in bold if differentiation is desired.
- The author citation term ex is to be used in parentheses, in the form "Taxon (ex Earlier) Later". Subsequent revisions should be cited in the form "Taxon (Later ex Earlier) Subsequent". non should also be parenthesized, like in "Achromobacter Yabuuchi and Yano 1981 (non Achromobacter Bergey et al. 1923)".

== Versions ==
- Buchanan, R. E., and Ralph St. John-Brooks. (1947, June) (Editors). Proposed Bacteriological Code of Nomenclature. Developed from proposals approved by International Committee on Bacteriological Nomenclature at the Meeting of the Third International Congress for Microbiology. Publication authorized in Plenary Session, pp. 61. Iowa State College Press, Ames, Iowa. U.S.A. HathiTrust.
- Buchanan R. E., St, John-Brooks R., Breed R. S. (1948). "International bacteriological code of nomenclature". Journal of Bacteriology. 55 (3): 287–306. doi:10.1128/jb.55.3.287-306.1948. PMC 518444. PMID 16561459. Reprinted 1949, Journal of General Microbiology 3, 444–462.
- International Committee on Bacteriological Nomenclature. (1958, June). International code of nomenclature of bacteria and viruses. Ames, Iowa State College Press. BHL.
- Lapage, S.P., Sneath, P.H.A., Lessel, E.F., Skerman, V.B.D., Seeliger, H.P.R. & Clark, W.A. (1975). International Code of Nomenclature of Bacteria. 1975 Revision. American Society of Microbiology, Washington, D.C.
- Lapage, S.P., Sneath, P.H.A., Lessel, E.F., Skerman, V.B.D., Seeliger, H.P.R. & Clark, W.A. (1992). International Code of Nomenclature of Bacteria. Bacteriological Code. 1990 Revision. American Society for Microbiology, Washington, D.C. link.
- Parker, C.T., Tindall, B.J. & Garrity, G.M., eds. (2019). International Code of Nomenclature of Prokaryotes. Prokaryotic Code (2008 Revision). International Journal of Systematic and Evolutionary Microbiology 69(1A): S1–S111. doi: 10.1099/ijsem.0.000778
- Oren, Aharon; Arahal, David R.; Göker, Markus; Moore, Edward R. B.; Rossello-Mora, Ramon; Sutcliffe, Iain C. (1 May 2023). "International Code of Nomenclature of Prokaryotes. Prokaryotic Code (2022 Revision)". International Journal of Systematic and Evolutionary Microbiology. 73 (5a). doi:10.1099/ijsem.0.005585. hdl:10261/338243. PMID 37219928.

== See also ==
- Glossary of scientific naming
- International Committee on Taxonomy of Viruses
- Microbiology Society
- Code of Nomenclature of Prokaryotes Described from Sequence Data – separate system, not recognized by the ICNP or ICSP
