= List of Prokaryotic names with Standing in Nomenclature =

Online database of prokaryotes taxonomy

Content
- Description: Prokaryotic nomenclature

Contact
- Research center: Leibniz Institute DSMZ
- Authors: Jean P. Euzéby, Aidan C. Parte, Markus Göker
- Primary citation: PMID 41160892
- Release date: 1997

Access
- Website: lpsn.dsmz.de

Tools
- Web: List of Prokaryotic names with Standing in Nomenclature

Miscellaneous
- Curation policy: manual

List of Prokaryotic names with Standing in Nomenclature (LPSN) is an online database that maintains information on the naming and taxonomy of prokaryotes, following the taxonomy requirements and rulings of the International Code of Nomenclature of Prokaryotes. The database was curated from 1997 to June 2013 by Jean P. Euzéby. From July 2013 to January 2020, LPSN was curated by Aidan C. Parte.

In February 2020, a new version of LPSN was published as a service of the Leibniz Institute DSMZ, thereby also integrating the Prokaryotic Nomenclature Up-to-date service and since 2022 LPSN is interconnected with the Type (Strain) Genome Server (TYGS), DSMZ's high-throughput platform for accurate genome-based taxonomy. In 2025, the List of Recommended Names for bacteria of medical importance (LoRN) was integrated into LPSN. It was established in collaboration with the Ad Hoc Committee on Mitigating Changes in Prokaryotic Nomenclature.

== See also ==
- International Committee on Systematics of Prokaryotes
