= Beas (disambiguation) =

The Beas River is a river in the northern part of India.

BEA Systems is an American software company.

Beas or BEAS may also refer to:

== Places ==
- Beas, Punjab, a town in Punjab, India
- Beas, Spain, a town and municipality in Huelva province, Spain
- Beas de Granada, a town in Granada province, Spain
- Beas de Guadix, a municipality in Granada province, Spain
- Beas de Segura, a city in Jaén province, Spain
- Pong Dam, also known as Beas Dam, an earth-fill embankment dam on the Beas River
- Sheung Yue River, also known as River Beas, in Hong Kong

== Other uses ==
- Beas Sarkar (born 1979), Indian cricketer
- INS Beas, ships of the Indian Navy

== See also ==
- Bea (disambiguation)
- Beas Pind, a village in Punjab, India
- Bias (disambiguation)
- Bipasha (disambiguation), alternative form of the river's name
- Hypanis (disambiguation), Greek name of the river
