= SPTO =

SPTO may refer to:

- South Pacific Tourism Organisation
- Spanish Patent and Trademark Office
- Scott Pilgrim Takes Off
- Single-person train operation
