= Belgian Co-ordinated Collections of Micro-organisms =

Government knowledge base for bacteria across multiple sciences

BCCM
- Founded: 1983
- Founder: Belgian Science Policy (Belspo)
- Type: Non-profit organization, Biological Resource Center
- Purpose: To be a solution partner for providing services of quality in microbial and genetic resources for academia and industry
- Location: Decentralized structure, Coordination Cell in Brussels, Belgium
- Services: Biological Resource Centre * bacteria * yeasts and fungi * plasmids * diatoms

The Belgian Coordinated Collections of Microorganisms (BCCM) is a Belgian government funded consortium of seven scientific institutions, who manage and exploit a collection of microbial and genetic resources. The consortium comprises more than 269,000 publicly available strains of bacteria including mycobacteria and cyanobacteria, filamentous fungi, yeasts, diatoms and plasmids.

BCCM is embedded in international initiatives such as the World Federation of Culture Collections (WFCC) and operates in compliance with the rules of the Nagoya Protocol.

== History ==
In 1983 the Belgian Council of Ministers decided to bring the microbial resources and the expertise available in different Belgian institutes together in a network of culture collections: with this the consortium of Belgian Coordinated Collections of Microorganisms (BCCM) saw the light of day.

In 1983, the BCCM consortium consisted of the microbial collections of one public scientific institution and two universities:

- the collection of medical yeasts and fungi of the Mycology Laboratory of Sciensano (former Scientific Institute of Public Health) (BCCM/IHEM)
- the collection of filamentous fungi, yeasts and arbuscular mycorrhizal fungi of the Université catholique de Louvain (BCCM/MUCL)
- the bacteria collection of the Laboratory for Microbiology of the Faculty of Sciences of the Ghent University (BCCM/LMG).

In 1990 the plasmid collection of the Laboratory of Molecular Biology of Ghent University was added to the consortium (BCCM/GeneCorner).

In 2011, 3 additional dedicated collections were included in the BCCM consortium:

- the diatom collection of the Laboratory for Protistology & Aquatic Ecology of Ghent University (BCCM/DCG)
- the mycobacteria collection of the Institute of Tropical Medicine in Antwerp (BCCM/ITM)
- the cyanobacteria collection of the Centre for Protein Engineering of the University of Liège (BCCM/ULC).

== Collection ==
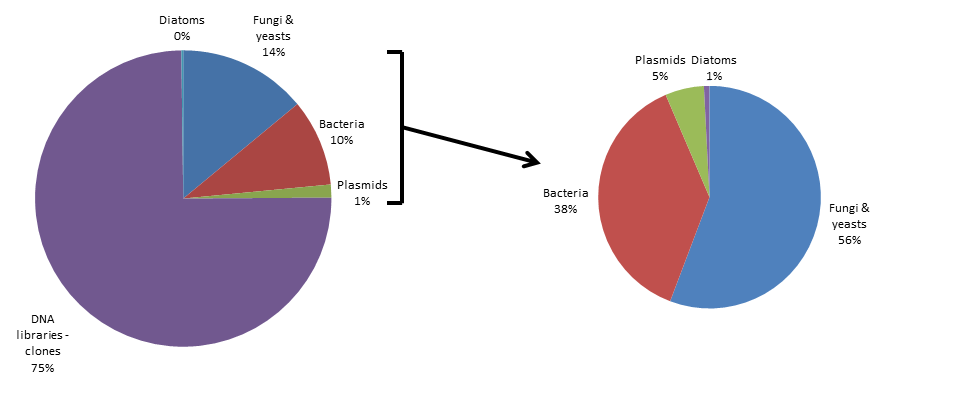
The BCCM collections contain more than 269.000 different resources.

Microorganisms are an important raw material in biotechnology. The properties of bacteria, fungi, yeasts and diatoms are used in countless industrial applications and processes. Consider, for example, fermentation processes and the use of probiotics in foods, the production of antibiotics in medicine, the use of microorganisms as growth promoting elements in agriculture, as bioremediators on polluted sites, etc.

Moreover, the properties of numerous microbial species are still unknown. Therefore public culture collections truly are a treasure trove of biological material, which can be explored through screening projects, for example.

== Services ==
BCCM operates under a multi-site ISO 9001 quality management system

Public collection

The BCCM collections gather biological resources from all over the world, from samples constructed or isolated by the collections themselves or from samples provided by other scientists. These well-documented and authenticated strains of bacteria, filamentous and yeasts fungi (including the most important test and control strains), diatoms, plasmids and DNA libraries are made publicly available and are distributed worldwide. Strains for educational purposes are also available.

Safe deposits

Resources in the safe deposit collection are not catalogued, and are only available to the depositor, or to third parties with the written authorisation of the depositor.

Patent deposits

Under a Belgian Government initiative the World Intellectual Property Organization (WIPO) has recognised the BCCM consortium as an International Depositary under the Budapest Treaty on the International Recognition of Deposit of Microorganisms for Patent Procedure. The BCCM contributes to the innovation process by accepting and storing deposits of the biological materials referred to in patent applications. Therefore, the BCCM collections can accept as patent deposits under the Budapest Treaty:

- all bacterial strains, except pathogens belonging to a hazard group higher than group 2 (BCCM/LMG)
- filamentous fungi and yeasts, non-pathogenic to humans and animals, representing a wide species diversity from natural and industrial sources as well as arbuscular mycorrhizal fungi preserved by in-vitro cultivation (BCCM/MUCL)
- filamentous fungi and yeasts, including pathogens that cause mycosis in man and animals (BCCM/IHEM)
- human and animal cell lines, including hybridomas (BCCM/GeneCorner)
- genetic material in a host or in the form of isolated material (e.g. plasmids, oncogenes, RNA) (BCCM/GeneCorner)

Other services

Next to its collections of biological materials, BCCM also offers expertise in:

- Identification : molecular biology – physiology – morphology – taxonomy
- Screenings (e.g. genomic) for properties of interest
- Industrial products and processes: quality – monitoring – biosafety
- Food and agricultural products and processes: quality – safety – monitoring
- Bio-assays : resistance – inhibition
- Tailor-made approaches

== Research ==
Research projects autonomously developed by BCCM staff or in collaboration with research groups of the host laboratories are focussed among others on:

- biodiversity and taxonomy
- preservation of genetic resources
- bioprospecting
- bioassays for antibacterial activity screening
- food bacteriology
- population genetics
- microbial interactions
- molecular basis of genetic resources

== See also ==
- American Type Culture Collection (ATCC)
- Belgian Federal Science Policy Office (BELSPO)
- Deutsche Sammlung von Mikroorganismen und Zellkulturen
- European Culture Collections' Organisation
- World Federation for Culture Collections

== Sources ==
- Belgian Co-ordinated Collections of Micro-organisms - BCCM
- Belgian Coordinated Collections of Micro-organisms (Dutch)
- Biological Resource Centre (French)
