= Screen =

Screen or Screens may refer to:

== Arts ==
- Screen printing or silkscreening, a printing method
- Big screen, a nickname for motion pictures
- Split screen (filmmaking), showing two or more images side by side
- Stochastic screening and Halftone photographic screening, methods of simulating grays with one-color printing

== Filtration and selection processes ==
- Screening (economics), the process of identifying or selecting members of a population based on one or more selection criteria
- Screening (biology), idem, on a scientific basis,
  - of which a genetic screen is a procedure to identify a particular kind of phenotype
  - the Irwin screen is a toxicological procedure
- Sieve, a mesh used to separate fine particles from coarse ones
- Mechanical screening, a unit operation in material handling which separates product into multiple grades by particle size

== Media and music ==
- Screen International, a film magazine covering the international film markets
- Screen (journal), a film and television studies journal published by Oxford University Press
- Screen (magazine), a weekly entertainment magazine from India
- The Screen (cinematheque), a theatre in Santa Fe, New Mexico, US
- Screenonline, online film and television magazine produced by the British Film Institute
- Screens (album), a 2009 album by Mint Chicks
- Screen (Australian TV series), Australian television series on Foxtel Arts channel
- "Screen", a song by Twenty One Pilots from their 2013 album Vessel (Twenty One Pilots album)
- "Screens", a song by Weezer from their 2021 album OK Human
- "Screen", a song by Hardy from his 2023 album The Mockingbird & the Crow

== Media display ==
- Electronic visual display, a cathode ray tube, liquid crystal display (LCD), or organic light emitting diode (OLED)
- Touchscreen, a display device that also takes input via embedded pressure sensors
- Projection screen, a viewing surface
- Display device, an output device for presentation of information in visual form
- Computer monitor, a monitor for use with a computer
- Television set, a device that combines a tuner, display, and loudspeakers

== Barriers, separation or partitioning ==
- Fire screen, a device to put in front of a fireplace
- Folding screen, a piece of decorative furniture
- Parclose screen, a partition in a church, separate from the Rood screen
- Rainscreen, in building construction
- Rood screen, a partition in a church which separates the chancel from the nave
- Screen door, a mesh, wire or plastic, that covers a door opening
- Smoke screen, smoke released in order to mask the movement or location of military United
- Windbreak of trees or shrubs
- Window screen, a plastic or wire mesh that covers a window opening
- Windshield (windscreen), protects the driver of a vehicle

== Software ==
- GNU Screen, a computer program which multiplexes computer terminals
- Another name for "dynpro" in ABAP programs
- Screen (image blending), a blending method for digital images
- Yahoo! Screen, a video streaming service

== Sports ==
- Screen (sports), when a player obstructs the vision or motion of another player
  - Screen (ice hockey), obstruction of a goaltender's view of the puck
- Screen pass, a type of offensive play in American football

== Other ==
- Screen (bridge), a device used in some Bridge games that visually separates partners at the table from each other
- Electronic page, an interface, scene, page, or group of content on an electronic display device
- Pat Screen, Louisiana State University football player and Mayor-President of East Baton Rouge Parish, Louisiana
- The conductive screen around the inner conductor(s) of an electrical cable, usually either foil or braided wire
- "The Verdant Braes of Screen", an Irish song in which the name Screen refers to Ballinascreen in County Londonderry, Northern Ireland
- Screen Holdings, a Japanese company in the technology manufacturing sector
- Charge screening, an effect in electromagnetism

== See also ==
- Screening (disambiguation)
- Skreen, village in County Sligo, Ireland
