= Screening =

Screening may refer to:

- Screening cultures, a type a medical test that is done to find an infection
- Screening (economics), a strategy of combating adverse selection (includes sorting resumes to select employees)
- Screening (environmental), a set of analytical techniques used to monitor levels of potentially hazardous organic compounds in the environment
- Screening (medicine), a strategy used in a population to identify an unrecognised disease in individuals without signs or symptoms
- Screening (printing), a process that represents lighter shades as tiny dots, rather than solid areas, of ink by passing ink through
- Screening (process stage), process stage when cleaning paper pulp
- Screening (tactical), one military unit providing cover for another in terms of both physical presence and firepower
- Baggage screening, a security measure
- Call screening, the process of evaluating the characteristics of a telephone call before deciding how or whether to answer it
- Electric-field screening, the damping of electric fields caused by the presence of mobile charge carriers
- Film screening, the displaying of a motion picture or film
- High-throughput screening, a method for scientific experimentation especially used in drug discovery
- Mechanical screening, the practice of taking granulated ore material and separating it into multiple grades by particle size
- Smoke screening, blanketing an area with smoke to provide cover

== As a proper name ==
- Screening (1997 film), a 1997 short film directed by Gil Cates Jr.
- Screening (2006 film), a 2006 short film directed by Anthony Green

== See also ==
- Screen (disambiguation)
- Screener (disambiguation)
