= Mycobacterium chlorophenolicum =

Scientific classification
- Domain: Bacteria
- Kingdom: Bacillati
- Phylum: Actinomycetota
- Class: Actinomycetes
- Order: Mycobacteriales
- Family: Mycobacteriaceae
- Genus: Mycobacterium
- Species: M. chlorophenolicum

Binomial name
- Mycobacterium chlorophenolicum Häggblom et al. 1994, ATCC 49826

Species of bacterium

Mycobacterium chlorophenolicum is a species of the phylum Actinomycetota (Gram-positive bacteria with high guanine and cytosine content, one of the dominant phyla of all bacteria), belonging to the genus Mycobacterium.

Type strain: strain PCP-I = ATCC 49826 = CIP 104189 = DSM 43826 = HAMBI 2278 = IEGM 559 = IFO (now NBRC) 15527 = JCM 7439 = NRRL B-16528.
