= Bipasha =

Bipasha is a Sanskrit Indian feminine given name, which means "the Beas River".

== Notable people named Bipasha ==
- Bipasha Basu (born 1979), Indian actress and model
- Bipasha Hayat (born 1971), Bangladeshi actress and model

== Others ==
- Bipasha (1962 film), a 1962 Indian film directed by Agradoot
- Bipasha: The Black Beauty, a 2006 Indian film directed by Shailendra Singh Rajput

== See also ==
- Beas (disambiguation)
