= Screener =

Screener may refer to:

- Screener (promotional), an advance copy of a film or television episode
- Screener (website), an American movie and television listing website
- A person who engages in any kind of screening

== See also ==
- Quality control
- Screening (disambiguation)
