= HPA Culture Collections =

Culture collections managed by UKHSA

The UKHSA Culture Collections are a group of cell collections in the UK.

In 2006, four cell collections were grouped under the management of the Health Protection Agency, later Public Health England, and then the UK Health Security Agency:

- the National Collection of Type Cultures (NCTC)
- the European Collection of Authenticated Cell Cultures (ECACC)
- the National Collection of Pathogenic Viruses (NCPV)
- the National Collection of Pathogenic Fungi (NCPF)
