= Microbiological culture =

Method of allowing microorganisms to multiply in a controlled medium

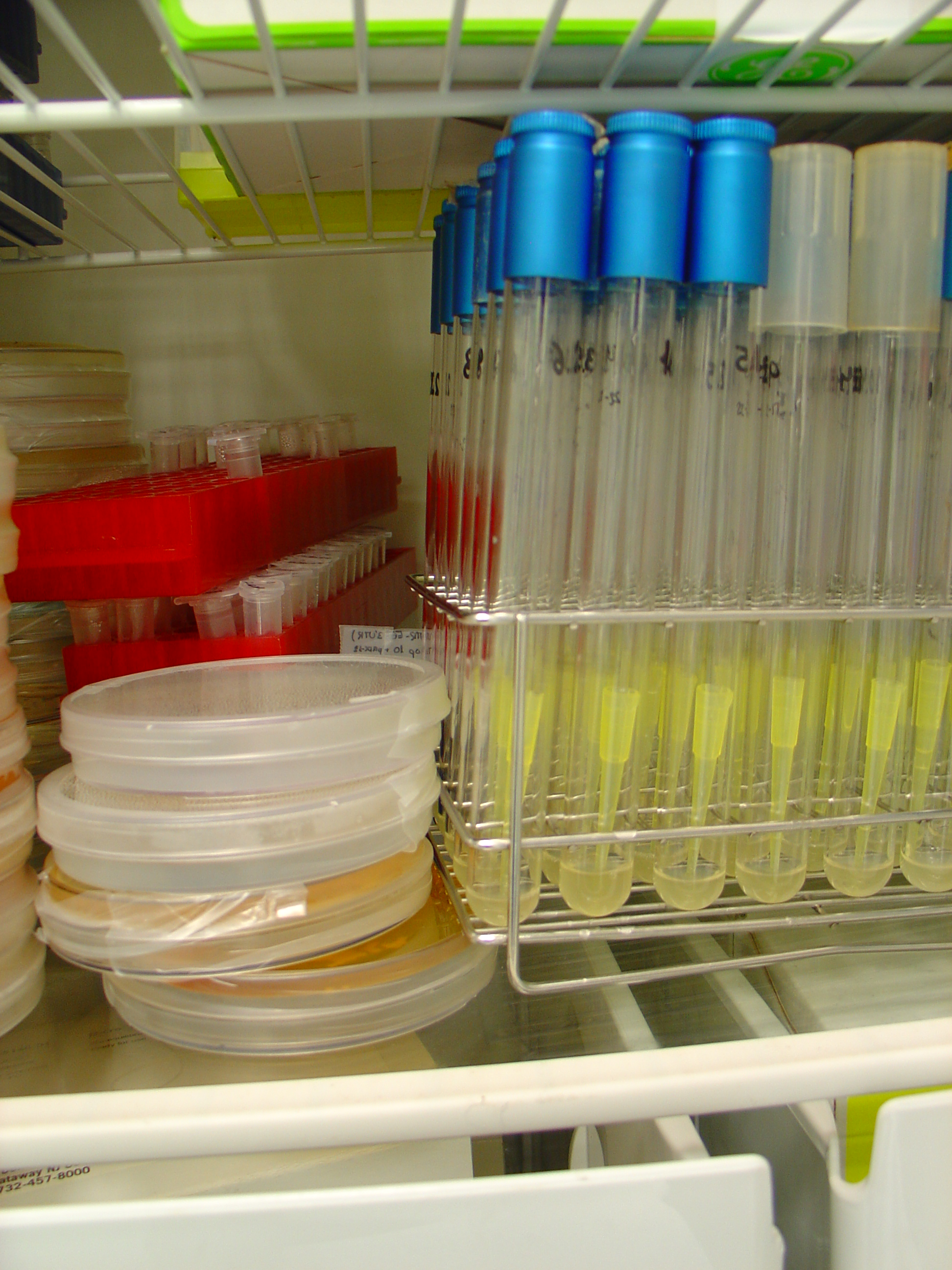
Microbial cultures on solid and liquid media

A microbiological culture, or microbial culture, is a method of multiplying microbial organisms by letting them reproduce in predetermined culture medium under controlled laboratory conditions. Microbial cultures are foundational and basic diagnostic methods used as research tools in molecular biology.

The term culture can also refer to the microorganisms being grown.

Microbial cultures are used to determine the type of organism, its abundance in the sample being tested, or both. It is one of the primary diagnostic methods of microbiology and used as a tool to determine the cause of infectious disease by letting the agent multiply in a predetermined medium. For example, a throat culture is taken by scraping the lining of tissue in the back of the throat and blotting the sample into a medium to be able to screen for harmful microorganisms, such as Streptococcus pyogenes, the causative agent of strep throat. Furthermore, the term culture is more generally used informally to refer to "selectively growing" a specific kind of microorganism in the lab.

It is often essential to isolate a pure culture of microorganisms. A pure (or axenic) culture is a population of cells or multicellular organisms growing in the absence of other species or types. A pure culture may originate from a single cell or single organism, in which case the cells are genetic clones of one another. For the purpose of gelling the microbial culture, the medium of agarose gel (agar) is used. Agar is a gelatinous substance derived from seaweed. A cheap substitute for agar is guar gum, which can be used for the isolation and maintenance of thermophiles.

== History ==
The first culture media was liquid media, designed by Louis Pasteur in 1860. This was used in the laboratory until Robert Koch's development of solid media in 1881. Koch's method of using a flat plate for his solid media was replaced by Julius Richard Petri's round box in 1887. Since these foundational inventions, a diverse array of media and methods have evolved to help scientists grow, identify, and purify cultures of microorganisms.

== Types of microbial cultures ==
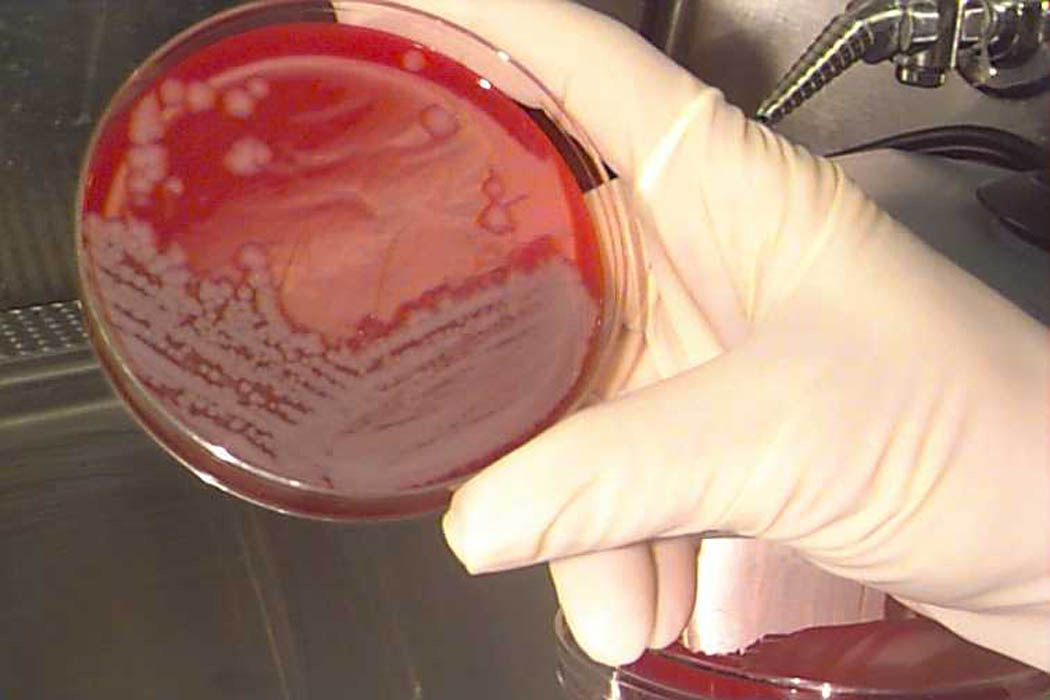
A culture of Bacillus anthracis

=== Prokaryotic culture ===
The culturing of prokaryotes typically involves bacteria, since archaea are difficult to culture in a laboratory setting. To obtain a pure prokaryotic culture, one must start the culture from a single cell or a single colony of the organism. Since a prokaryotic colony is the asexual offspring of a single cell, all of the cells are genetically identical and will result in a pure culture.

=== Viral culture ===
Virus and phage cultures require host cells in which the virus or phage multiply. For bacteriophages, cultures are grown by infecting bacterial cells. The phage can then be isolated from the resulting plaques in a lawn of bacteria on a plate. Viral cultures are obtained from their appropriate eukaryotic host cells. The streak plate method is a way to physically separate the microbial population, and is done by spreading the inoculate back and forth with an inoculating loop over the solid agar plate. Upon incubation, colonies will arise and single cells will have been isolated from the biomass. Once a microorganism has been isolated in pure culture, it is necessary to preserve it in a viable state for further study and use in cultures called stock cultures. These cultures have to be maintained, such that there is no loss of their biological, immunological and cultural characters.

=== Eukaryotic cell culture ===
Eukaryotic cell cultures provide a controlled environment for studying eukaryotic organisms. Single-celled eukaryotes - such as yeast, algae, and protozoans - can be cultured in similar ways to prokaryotic cultures. The same is true for multicellular microscopic eukaryotes, such as C. elegans.

Although macroscopic eukaryotic organisms are too large to culture in a laboratory, cells taken from these organisms can be cultured. This allows researchers to study specific parts and processes of a macroscopic eukaryote in vitro.

== Culture methods ==
Method overview
| Method | Description | Uses and advantages |
|---|---|---|
| Liquid/broth cultures | Organisms are inoculated into a flask of liquid media | Growing up large volumes of organism, antimicrobial assays, bacterial differentiation |
| Agar plates | Organisms are placed or streaked onto petri dishes | Provides a solid surface for stationary growth, compact and stackable |
| Agar based dipsticks | Essentially miniature agar plates in the form of dipsticks | Diagnostic purposes, can be used anywhere, cost effective, easy to use |
| Selective and differential media | Organisms are cultured in/on specific media to select for or differentiate between certain ones | Help identify unknown organisms, assist in purifying cultures |
| Stab cultures | Organisms are inoculated into a test tube of solid agar | Short-term storage, bacterial differentiation |

=== Liquid cultures ===
One method of microbiological culture is liquid culture, in which the desired organisms are suspended in a liquid nutrient medium, such as Luria broth, in an upright flask. This allows a scientist to grow up large amounts of bacteria or other microorganisms for a variety of downstream applications.

Liquid cultures are ideal for preparation of an antimicrobial assay in which the liquid broth is inoculated with bacteria and let to grow overnight (a ‘shaker’ may be used to mechanically mix the broth, to encourage uniform growth). Subsequently, aliquots of the sample are taken to test for the antimicrobial activity of a specific drug or protein (antimicrobial peptides).

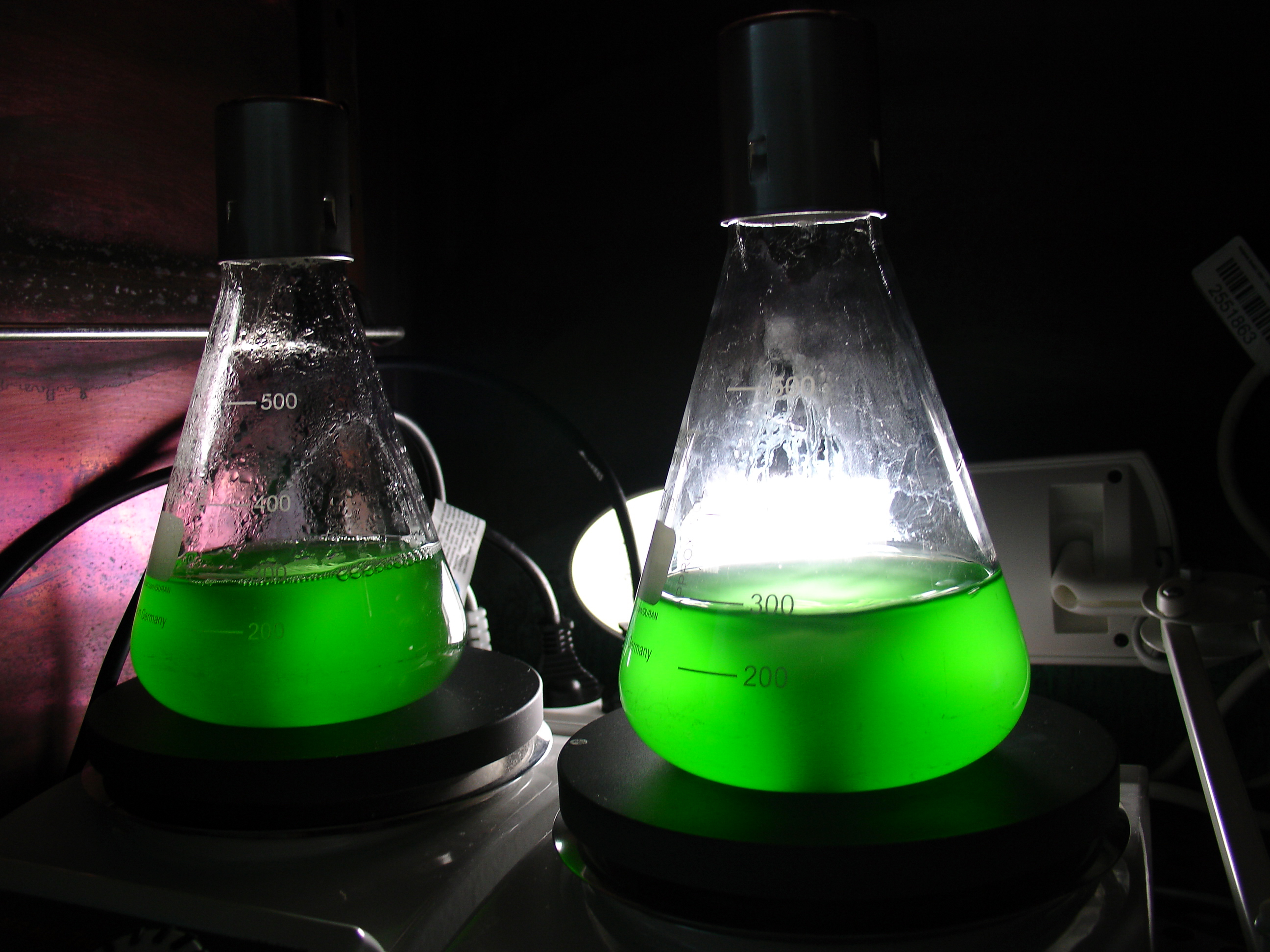
Liquid cultures of the cyanobacterium Synechococcus PCC 7002

Static liquid cultures may be used as an alternative. These cultures are not shaken, and they provide the microbes with an oxygen gradient.

=== Agar plates ===
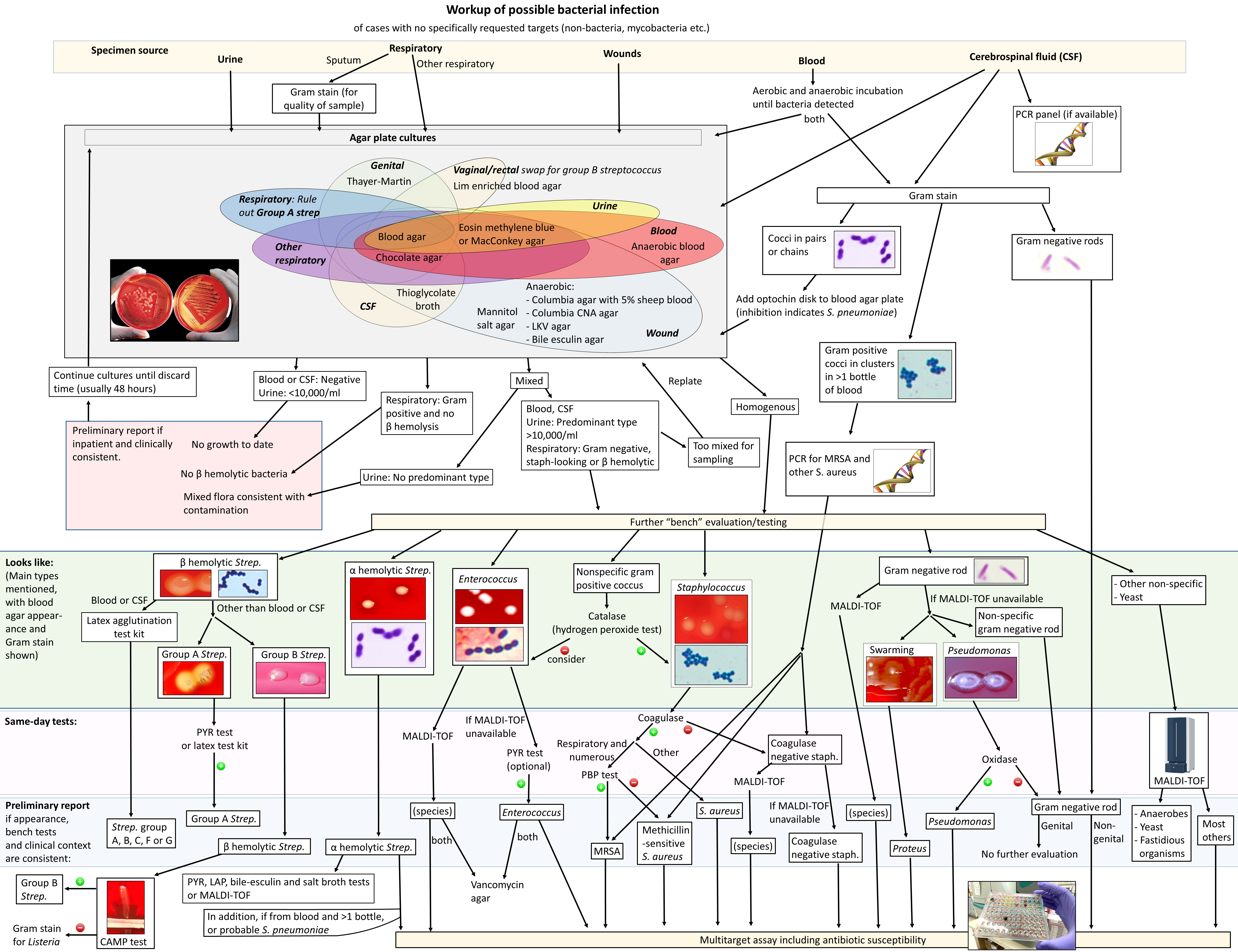
Example of a workup algorithm of possible bacterial infection in cases with no specifically requested targets (non-bacteria, mycobacteria etc.), with most common situations and agents seen in a New England setting. The grey box near top left shows a Venn diagram of what culture media are routinely used for various sources or purposes.

Microbiological cultures can be grown in petri dishes of differing sizes that have a thin layer of agar-based growth medium. Once the growth medium in the petri dish is inoculated with the desired bacteria, the plates are incubated at the optimal temperature for the growing of the selected bacteria (for example, usually at 37 degrees Celsius, or the human body temperature, for cultures from humans or animals, or lower for environmental cultures). After the desired level of growth is achieved, agar plates can be stored upside down in a refrigerator for an extended period of time to keep bacteria for future experiments.

There are a variety of additives that can be added to agar before it is poured into a plate and allowed to solidify. Some types of bacteria can only grow in the presence of certain additives. This can also be used when creating engineered strains of bacteria that contain an antibiotic-resistance gene. When the selected antibiotic is added to the agar, only bacterial cells containing the gene insert conferring resistance will be able to grow. This allows the researcher to select only the colonies that were successfully transformed.

=== Agar based dipsticks ===
Miniaturized version of agar plates implemented to dipstick formats, e.g. Dip Slide, Digital Dipstick show potential to be used at the point-of-care for diagnosis purposes. They have advantages over agar plates since they are cost effective and their operation does not require expertise or laboratory environment, which enable them to be used at the point-of-care.

=== Selective and differential media ===
Selective and differential media reveal characteristics about the microorganisms being cultured on them. This kind of media can be selective, differential, or both selective and differential. Growing a culture on multiple kinds of selective and differential media can purify mixed cultures and reveal to scientists the characteristics needed to identify unknown cultures.

==== Selective media ====
Selective media is used to distinguish organisms by allowing for a specific kind of organism to grow on it while inhibiting the growth of others. For example, eosin methylene blue (EMB) may be used to select against Gram-positive bacteria, most of which have hindered growth on EMB, and select for Gram-negative bacteria, whose growth is not inhibited on EMB.

==== Differential media ====
Scientists use differential media when culturing microorganisms to reveal certain biochemical characteristics about the organisms. These revealed traits can then be compared to attributes of known microorganisms in an effort to identify unknown cultures. An example of this is MacConkey agar (MAC), which reveals lactose-fermenting bacteria through a pH indicator that changes color when acids are produced from fermentation.

==== Multitarget panels ====
On multitarget panels, bacteria isolated from a previously grown colony are distributed into each well, each of which contains growth medium as well as the ingredients for a biochemical test, which will change the absorbance of the well depending on the bacterial property for the tested target. The panel will be incubated in a machine, which subsequently analyses each well with a light-based method such as colorimetry, turbidimetry, or fluorometry. The combined results will be automatically compared to a database of known results for various bacterial species, in order to generate a diagnosis of what bacterial species is present in the current panel. Simultaneously, it performs antibiotic susceptibility testing.

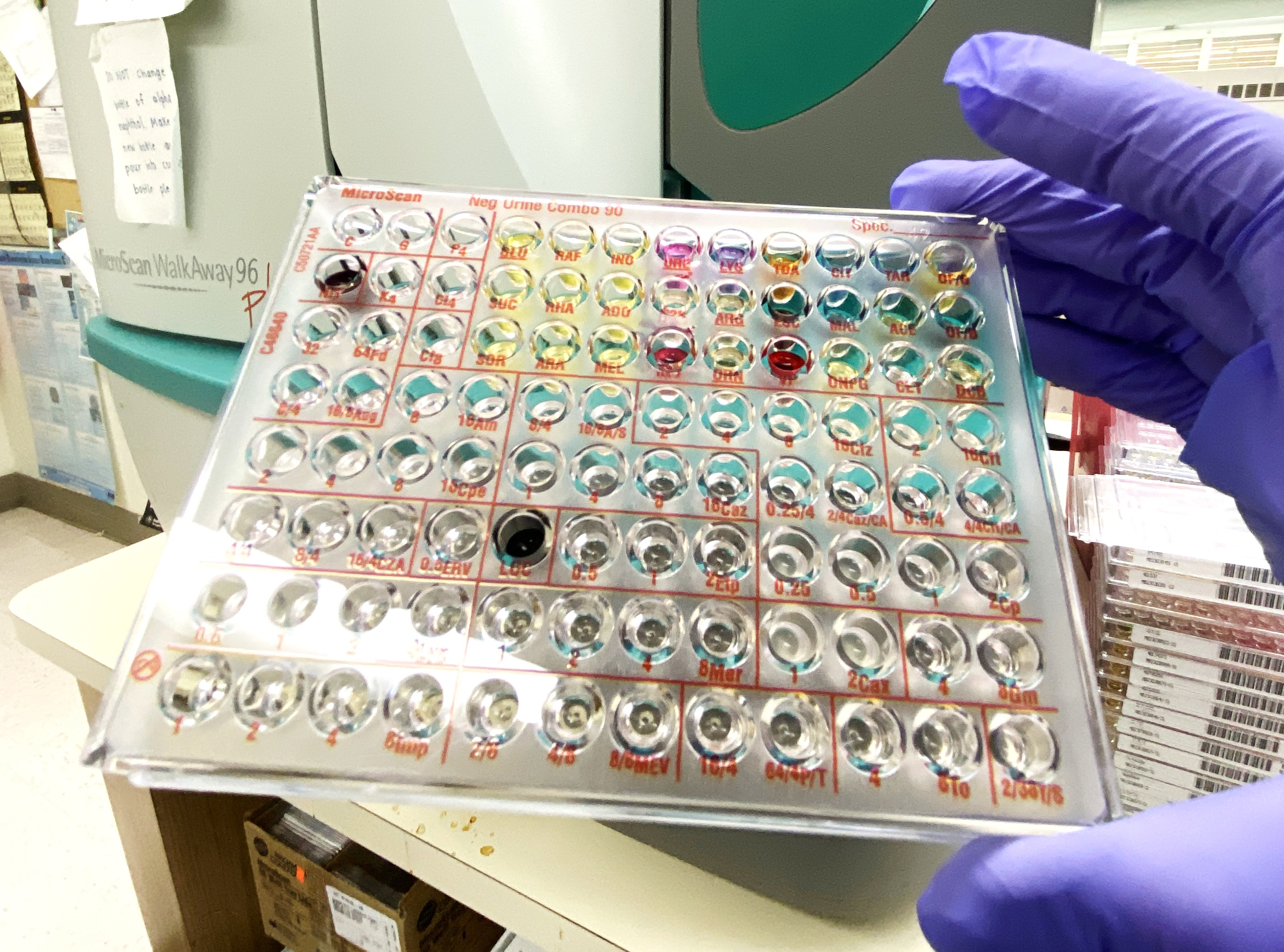
Multitarget microbial panel. A small amount of the bacteria to be tested is placed in each well, each of which has the ingredients for a separate test.

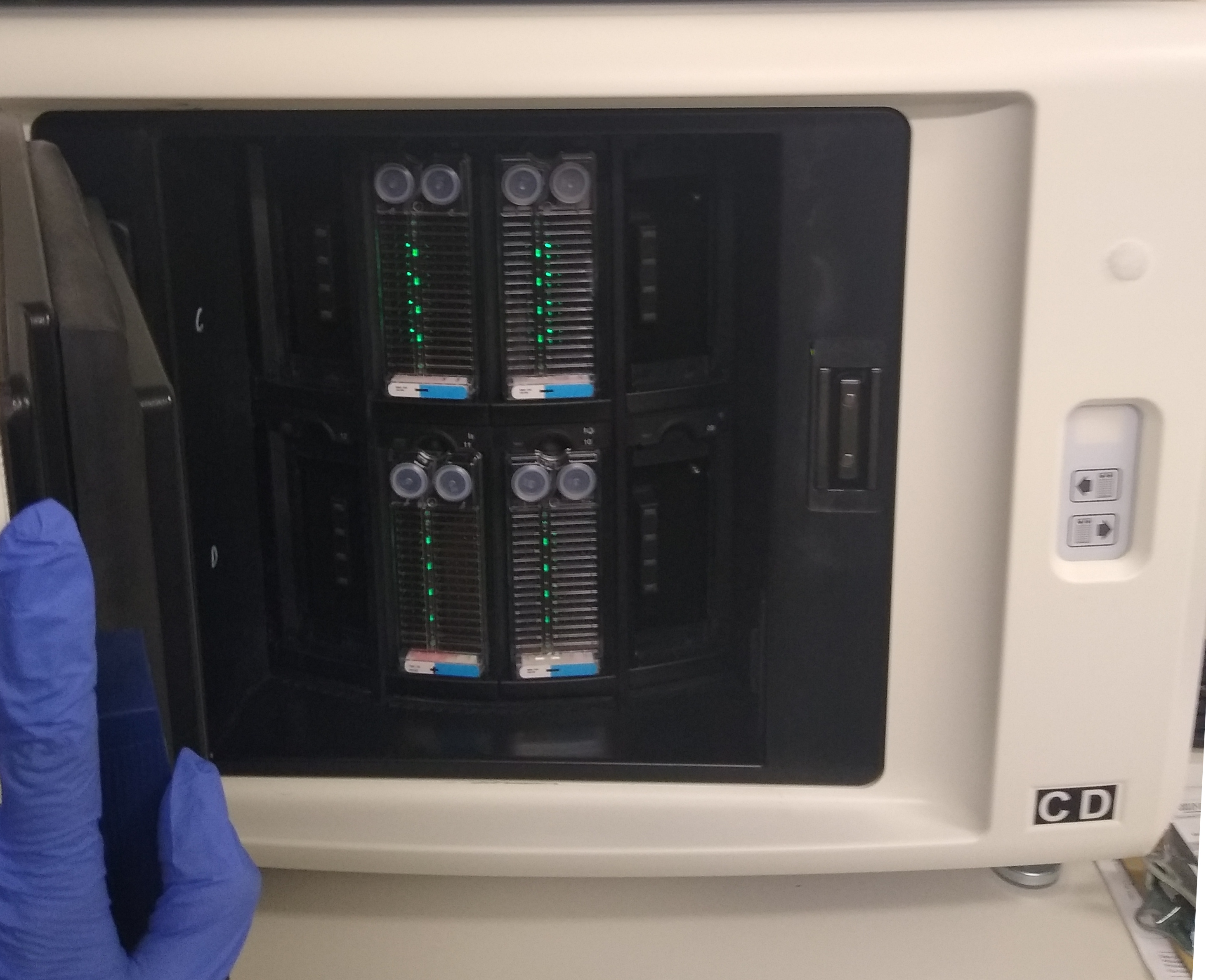
Microbial panels loaded into an instrument used for automated antibiotic sensitivity testing of each well.

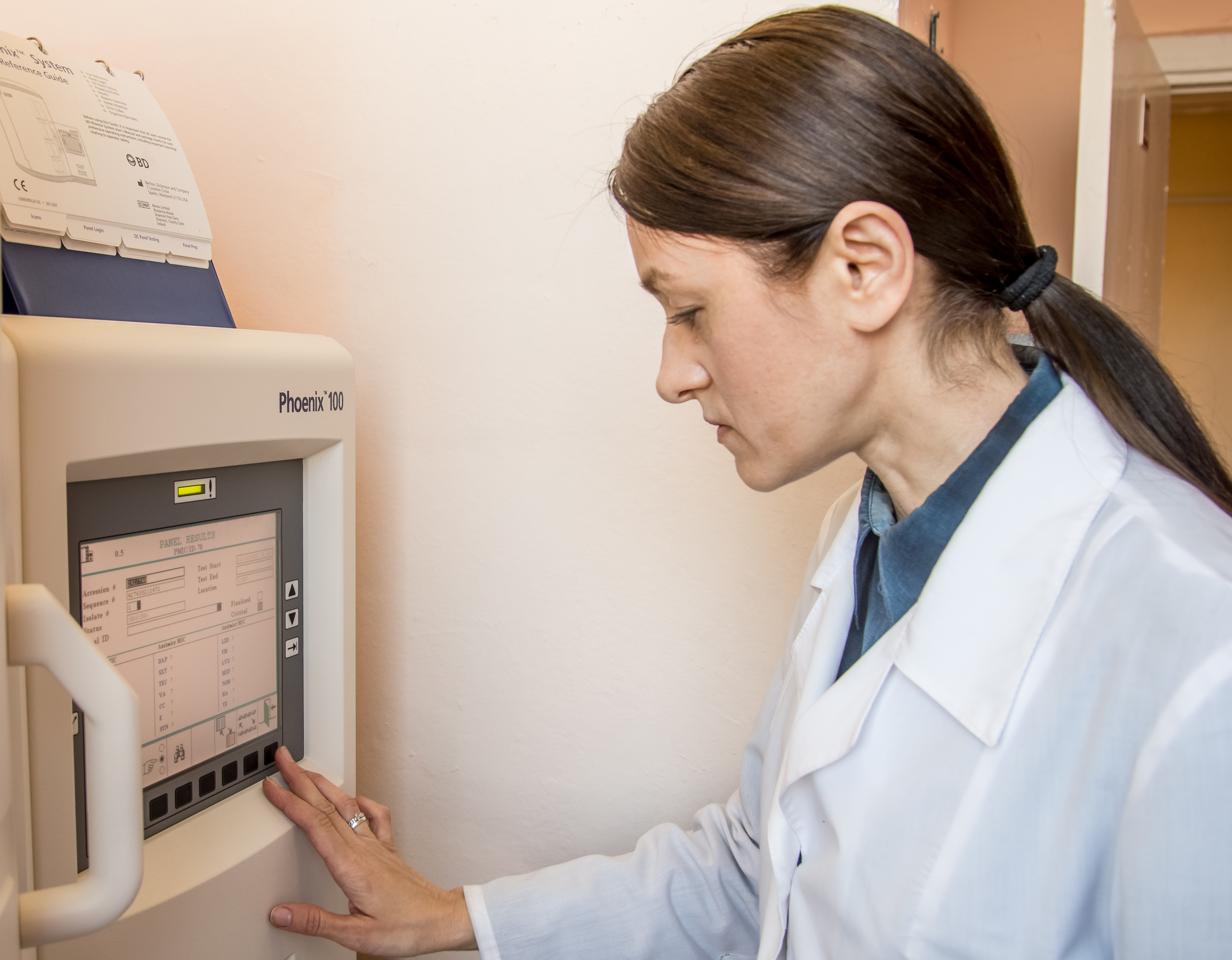
A laboratory worker reviews results displayed on the screen of the automated analyzer.

=== Stab cultures ===
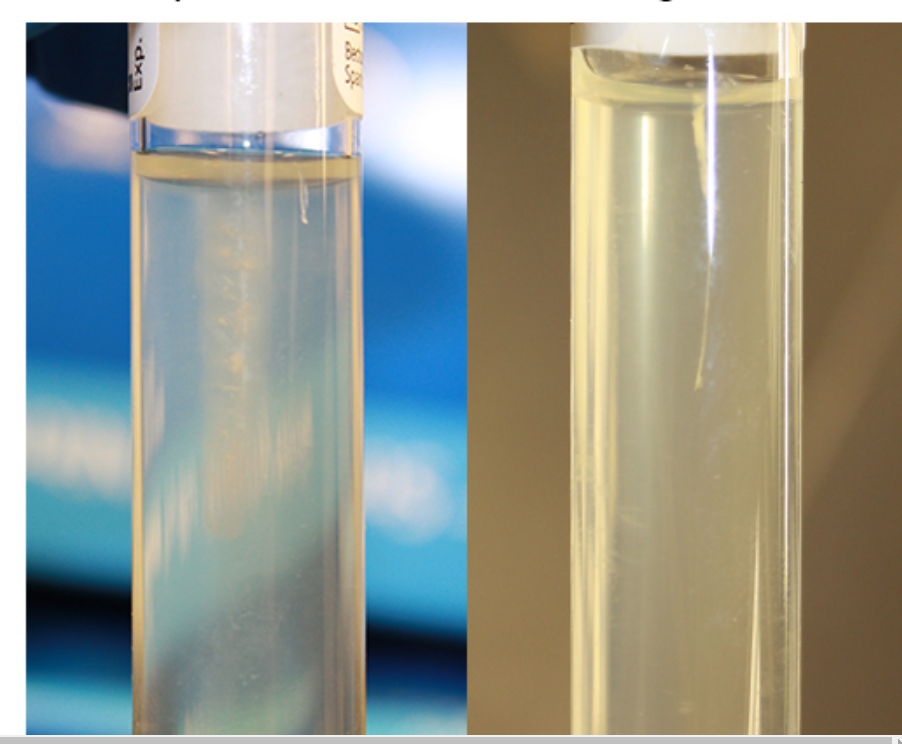
Motile and non-motile bacteria can be differentiated along the stab lines. Motile bacteria (left) will grow out from the stab line while non-motile bacteria (right) are present only along the stab line.

Stab cultures are similar to agar plates, but are formed by solid agar in a test tube. Bacteria is introduced via an inoculation needle or a pipette tip being stabbed into the center of the agar. Bacteria grow in the punctured area. Stab cultures are most commonly used for short-term storage or shipment of cultures. Additionally, stab cultures can reveal characteristics about cultured microorganisms such as motility or oxygen requirements.

=== Solid plate culture of thermophilic microorganisms ===
For solid plate cultures of thermophilic microorganisms such as Bacillus acidocaldarius, Bacillus stearothermophilus, Thermus aquaticus and Thermus thermophilus etc. growing at temperatures of 50 to 70 degrees °C, low acyl clarified gellan gum has been proven to be the preferred gelling agent comparing to agar for the counting or isolation or both of the above thermophilic bacteria.

== Cell culture collections ==
Microbial culture collections focus on the acquisition, authentication, production, preservation, cataloguing and distribution of viable cultures of standard reference microorganisms, cell lines and other materials for research in microbial systematics. Culture collection are also repositories of type strains.

Major national culture collections.
| Collection Acronym | Name | Location |
|---|---|---|
| ATCC | American Type Culture Collection | Manassas, Virginia |
| BCCM | Belgian Co-ordinated Collections of Micro-organisms | Decentralized, Coordination Cell in Brussels, Belgium |
| CCUG | Culture Collection University of Gothenburg | Gothenburg, Sweden |
| CECT | Colección Española de Cultivos Tipo | Valencia, Spain |
| CIP | Collection d'Institut Pasteur | Paris, France |
| DSMZ | Deutsche Sammlung von Mikroorganismen und Zellkulturen | Braunschweig, Germany |
| ICMP | International Collection of Microorganisms from Plants | Auckland, New Zealand |
| JCM | Japan Collection of Microorganisms | Tsukuba, Ibaraki, Japan |
| NCTC | National Collection of Type Cultures | Public Health England, London, United Kingdom |
| NCIMB | National Collection of Industrial, Food and Marine Bacteria | Aberdeen, Scotland |
| NCMR | National Centre for Microbial Resource | Pune, India |
| NCPPB | National Collection of Plant Pathogenic Bacteria | York, England |
| MTCC | Microbial Type Culture Collection and Gene Bank | Chandigarh, India |

== See also ==
- Blood culture
- Changestat
- Colony-forming unit
- Gellan gum
- Microbial dark matter
- Microbial Food Cultures
- Screening cultures
- Sputum culture
- Synchronous culture
