= Inoculation needle =

Laboratory equipment

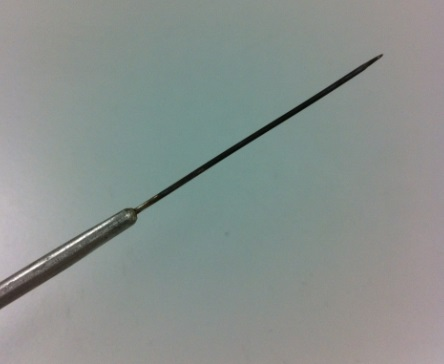
A close up of an inoculation needle

An inoculation needle is a laboratory equipment used in the field of microbiology to transfer and inoculate living microorganisms. It is one of the most commonly implicated biological laboratory tools and can be disposable or re-usable. A standard reusable inoculation needle is made from nichrome or platinum wire affixed to a metallic handle. A disposable inoculation needle is often made from plastic resin. The base of the needle is dulled, resulting in a blunted end.

== Uses ==
Inoculation needles are primarily applied in microbiology for studying bacteria and fungi on semi-solid media. Biotechnology, cell biology and immunology may also utilize needle-oriented culture methods.

The application of inoculation needles focuses on the inoculation and isolation of very defined regions of the cultures and the requirements of least disturbance between two closely crowded microbial colonies. It can also be used in harpooning under a low magnification microscope.

Streaking on streak plates, fish tail inoculation of slant cultures and the inoculation of stab cultures can be done with the inoculation needle. Stab cultures specifically require the inoculation needle and is used to study cell motility, microbial oxygen requirements using Thioglycolate cultures, and the gelatin liquefaction of bacteria.

== Operation ==
=== Sterilization ===
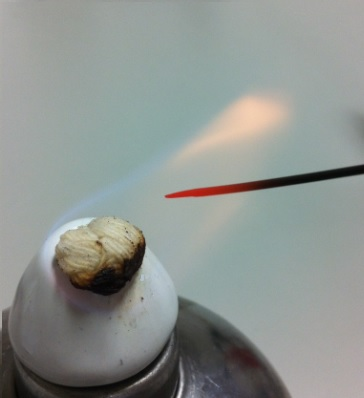
Sterilization of an inoculation needle via alcohol burner

The inoculation needle is sterilized using the aseptic technique. An open flame from an incinerator, a bunsen burner, or an alcohol burner is used to flame along the tip and the length of the needle that is to be in contact with the inoculum (or the propagule). For ease of manipulation it is common practice to hold the needle with the dominant hand as if handling a pencil. The needle will be flamed at a downward angle through the flame's inner cone until it is red-hot. The downward angle will minimize the amount of microbial aerosols created.

Inoculation needles must be sterilized prior and following contact with microbial life forms to ensure no contamination of the culture, the sterile mediums, and the surrounding environment.

=== Transfer ===
In inoculation the inoculation needle is first employed to transfer microbial life forms from a culture to the needle to be used in further inoculating procedures. Sources of inoculum include broth cultures, slant cultures, and plate cultures.

Broth culture

An inoculation needle is used in the transfer of microorganisms from a broth culture by first employing a vortex mixer to ensure a uniform suspension of the microorganisms within the broth. Aseptic technique is then applied to the needle. Once the needle is flamed and sterilized the culture broth cap will be removed by the needle hand. The open end of the broth culture will be flamed to reduce risk of contamination and the creation of aerosols.

While maintaining a fixed position of the needle, the culture broth will be moved up the needle until the needle tip is submerged. During the withdrawal of the broth culture the needle and the needle hand should not move in order to prevent springing action. The transfer from broth to needle concludes with flaming the open end of the broth culture and the closing of the lid while keeping the needle hand immobile.

Slant culture

In slant culture transfer, the inoculation needle will be first treated with the aseptic technique by flaming. The slant culture cap is then removed and secured using the needle hand. Flaming the open end of the slant culture will prevent contamination and the formation of aerosols.

Transfer happens once the tip of the inoculation needle comes into contact with the agar surface of the slant culture. The inoculation needle should not move in the process. The agar slant culture will be moved up to the needle to prevent jostling of the needle. Once the transfer is complete from slant culture to needle, the open end of the culture will be treated with flame and the cap will be replaced.

Plate culture

An inoculation needle is used in the transfer of microbial organisms from plate culture to needle by first sterilizing the needle to prevent contaminants. The lid of the agar plate culture is then removed to allow the needle access to the microorganisms cultured on the agar plate. The lid is held hovering above the culture plate to prevent contamination from the surrounding environment.

The inoculation needle after incineration is cooled down on an uninoculated region of the agar plate culture. Too much heat will kill off the inoculum during the direct contact of a flamed inoculation needle. The inoculation needle is withdrawn from the agar culture after obtaining a small colony and the agar plate lid is then replaced.

=== Inoculation ===
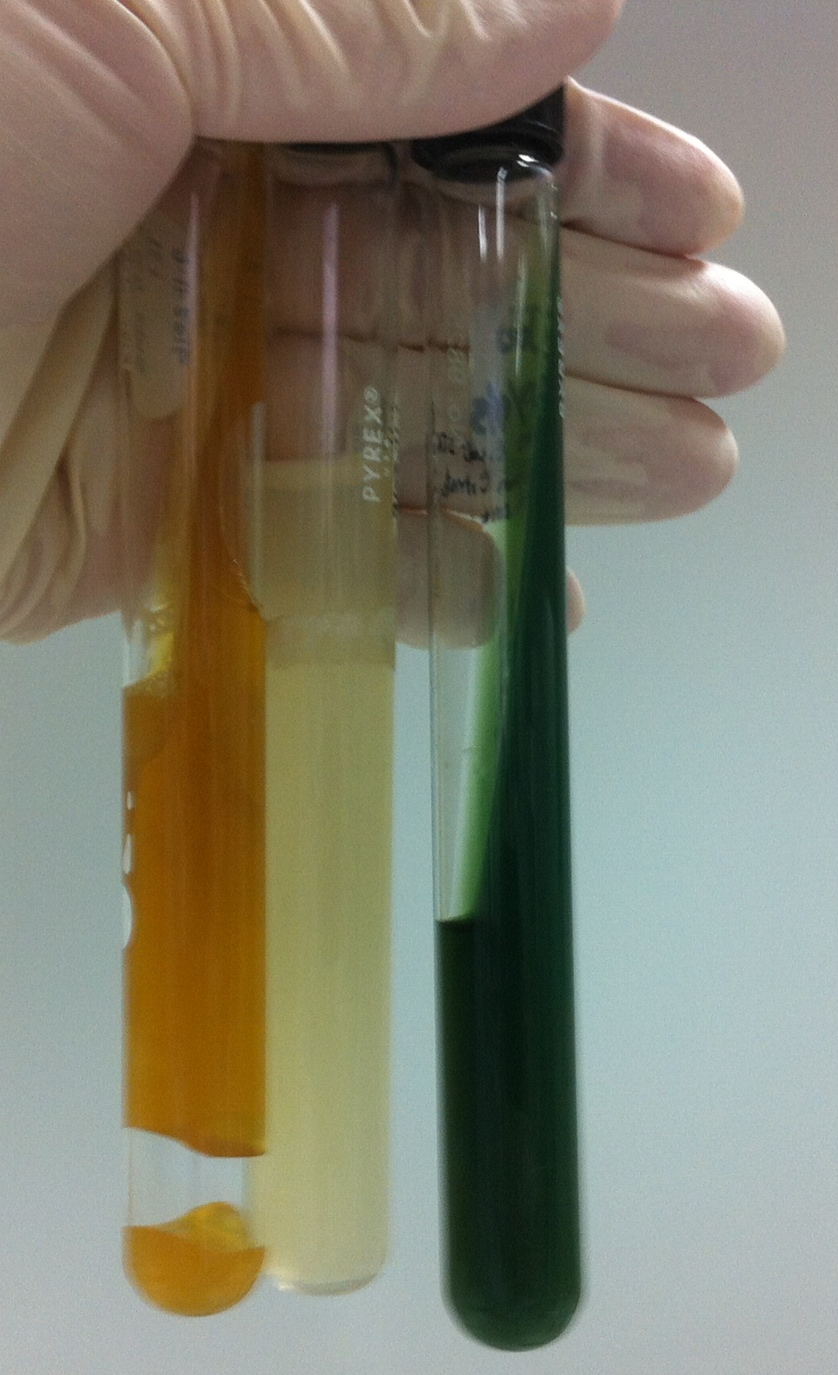
Stab Cultures after inoculation by inoculation needle with E. coli from left to right: TSI, Soft nutrient, Simmons Citrate agar

Inoculation of the microorganisms will be done directly after the transfer from culture to inoculation needle. The inoculum is commonly inoculated to broth cultures, slant cultures, plate cultures, and stab cultures.

Broth culture

An inoculation needle is used in inoculating a sterile broth culture. Flaming the open end of the broth will keep it sterile. The broth will be moved up to the needle so that the needle tip is submerged while maintaining the needle's original position. Careful swirling of the needle can help the inoculation of the microorganism from the needle to the sterile broth.

The inoculated broth culture is then removed from the needle. Aseptic technique is applied to the open end of the broth culture to prevent contaminants, and the needle is flamed for sterilization.

Slant culture

An inoculation needle is used to inoculate a slant culture in a fish tail inoculation technique. After the microorganisms transfer from the original microbial culture to the inoculation needle the sterile slant culture is uncapped. The open end of the uncapped slant culture is then flamed. The slant will be positioned to move up the needle until the inoculation needle tip lightly come into contact with the base surface of the sterile media. The inoculation needle inoculates the sterile agar by the manipulation of the media so that the needle tip grazes the agar surface in a zigzag pattern. Aseptic technique is then applied to the withdrawn inoculation needle.

Plate culture

Inoculation of a plate culture is done through the streaking technique to make a streak plate. After lifting the lid so that it hovers above the sterile agar plate, the inoculation needle will be streaked across the plate in controlled directions. Microbial aerosols can be created from the hitting of the inoculation tip to the sides of the agar plate. The inoculation needle is then withdrawn from the inoculated agar plate culture and flamed.

Stab culture

An inoculation needle is an essential tool in inoculating a stab culture. A sterile stab culture cap is removed and the open end is flamed. The needle tip and its length is then pushed into the stab media and stopped once the needle tip reaches 0.5 inches away from the bottom of the stab media. The inoculation needle is withdrawn from the media in the same direction and path that it was pushed into the stab media to prevent the wobbling effect that may disturb the culture. The needle is sterilized by flaming.

== See also ==
- Inoculation loop
- Streaking (microbiology)
- Microbiological culture

== Gallery ==
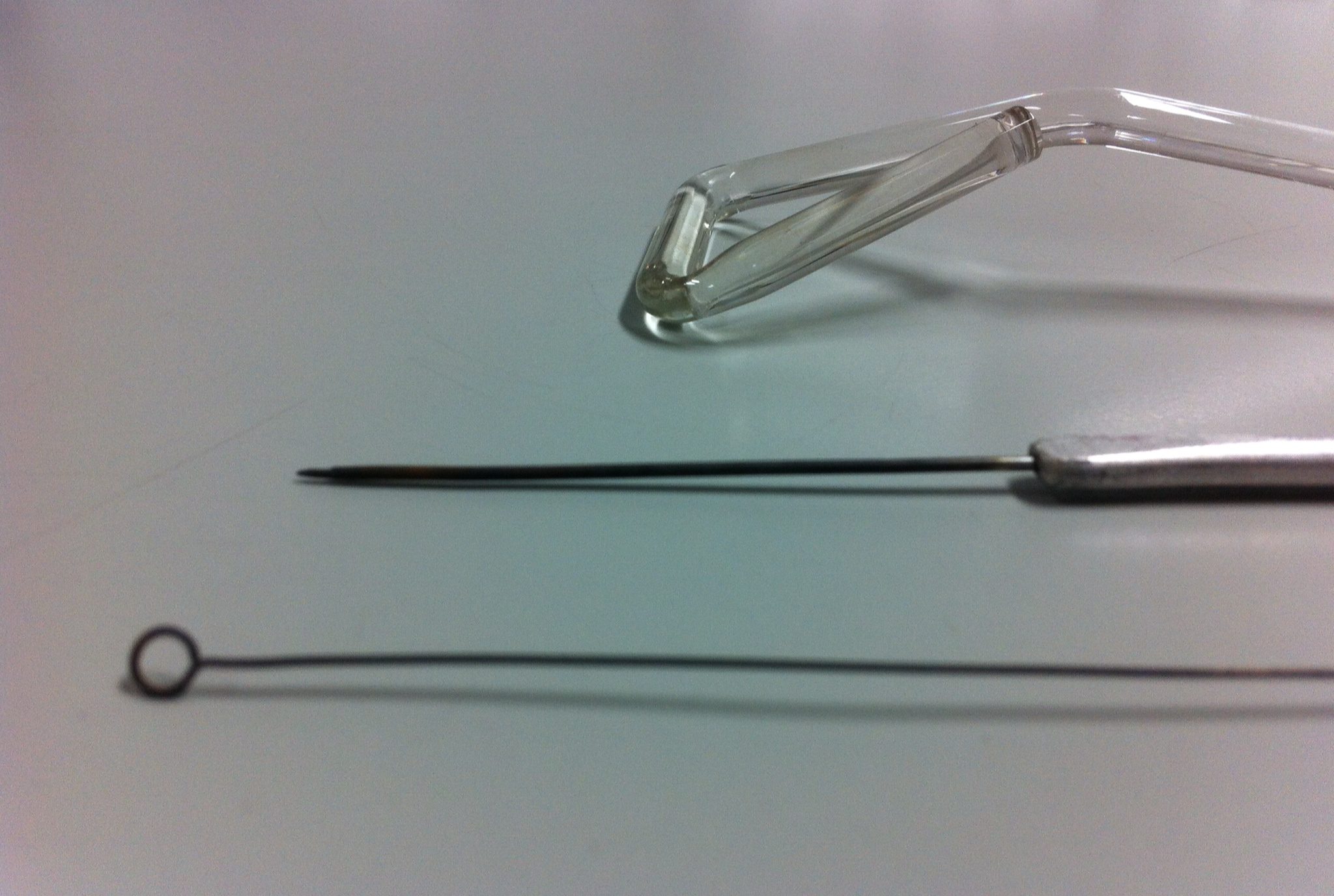
1

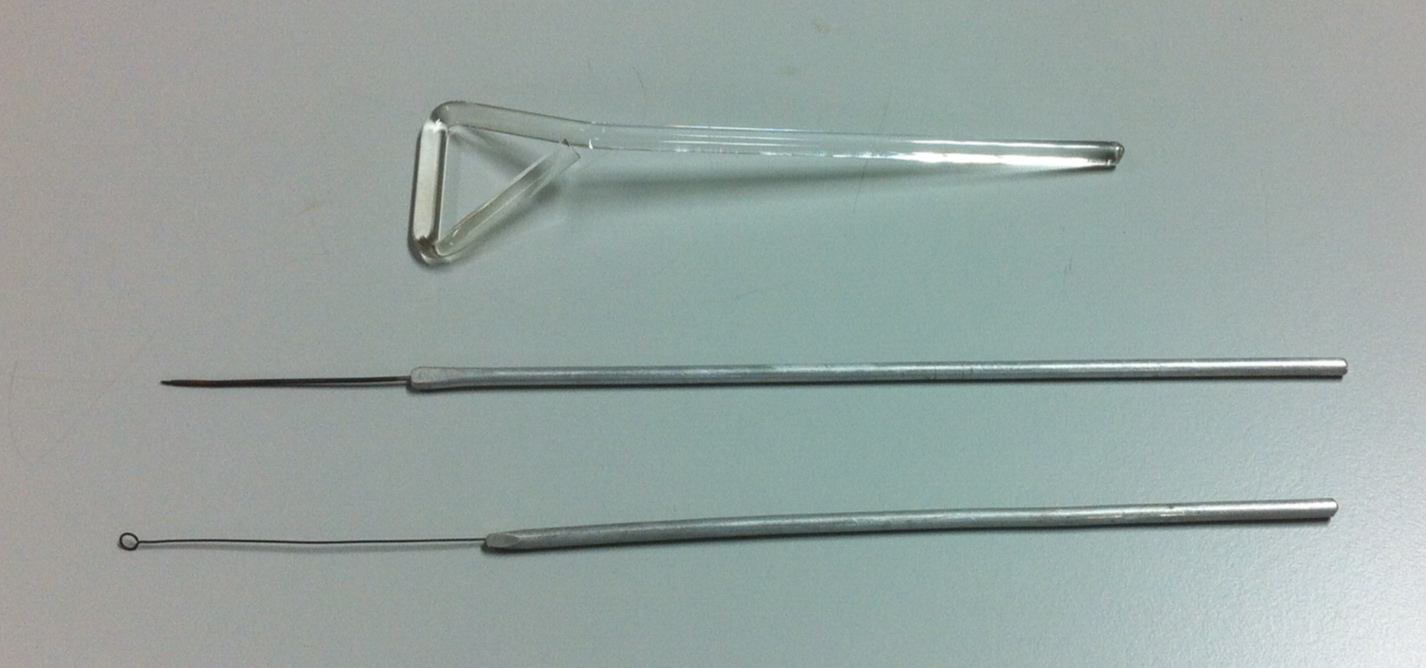
2

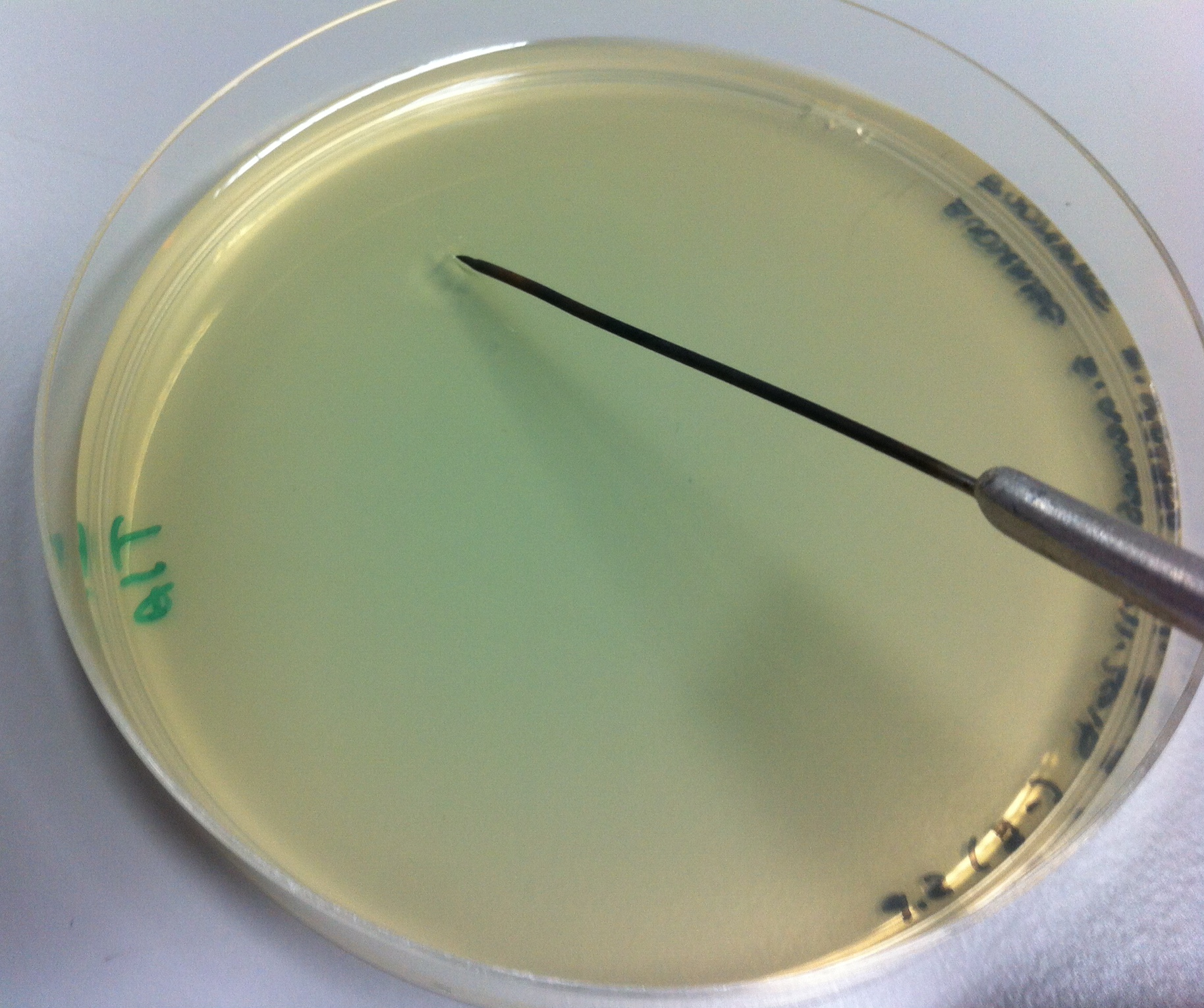
3

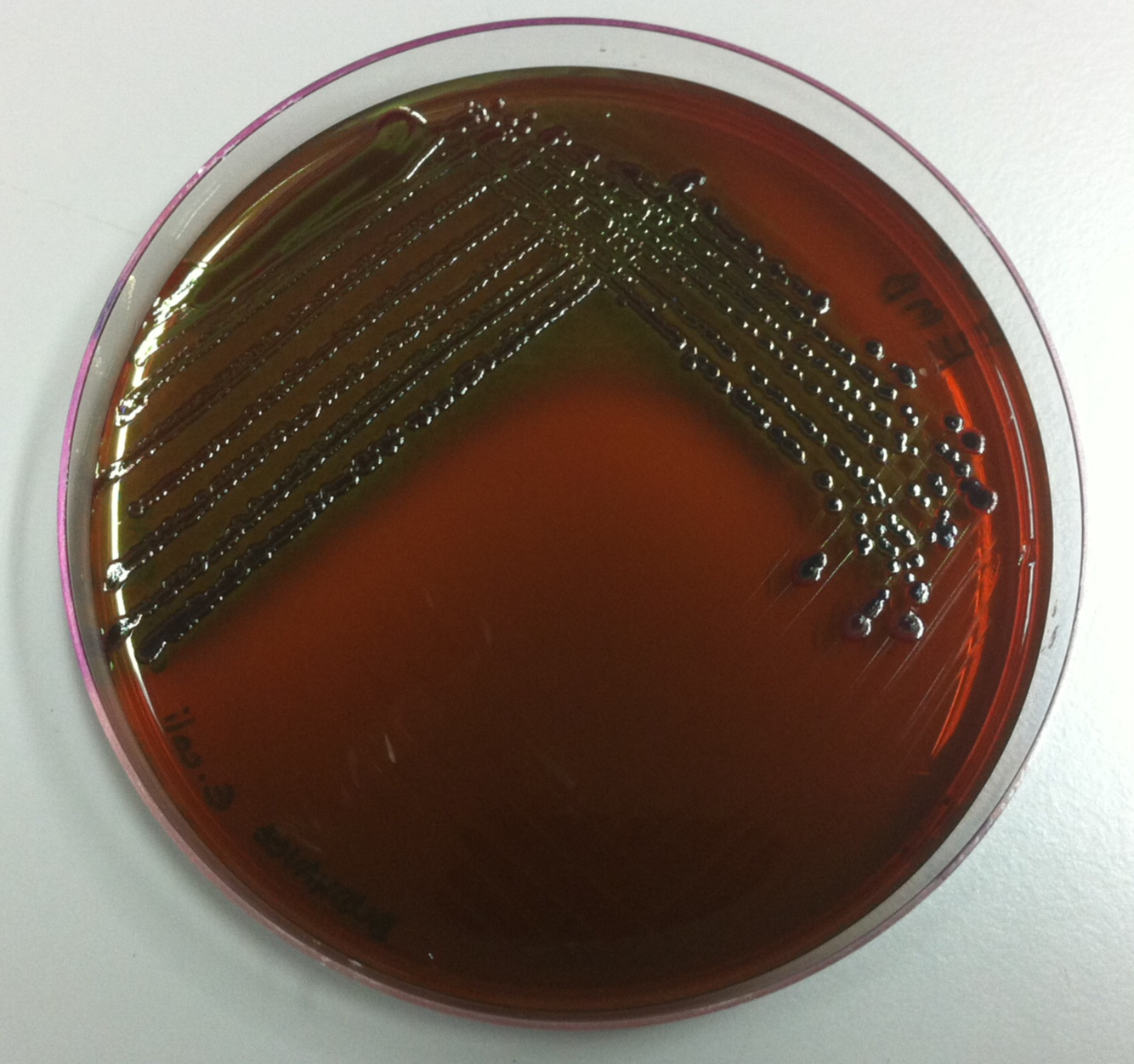
4
