= Grupo Axé Capoeira =

- Date founded: 1982
- Country of origin: Brazil
- Founder: Mestre Barrão
- Current head: Mestre Barrão
- Arts taught: Capoeira • Acrobatics • Kicking • MMA
- Ancestor arts: Capoeira • Capoeira Contemporânea
- Descendant arts: none
- Descendant schools: none
- Official website: Axé Capoeira

Grupo Axé Capoeira is an international Capoeira organization with headquarters in Vancouver. Founded in 1982 by Mestre Barrão in Recife, Brazil, it subsequently established academies throughout Canada, United States, Europe, Asia and South America. The school teaches Contemporary Capoeira (Capoeira Contemporânea). It has released multiple albums and DVDs, as well as performance videos.
