= Hypanis =

Hypanis may refer to:

- The Ancient Greek name of the Southern Bug river in Southern Ukraine
- The Ancient Greek name of the Kuban River in Southern Russia
- The Ancient Greek name of the Beas River in the Punjab state of India, also called Hypasis
- Hypanis (bivalve), a genus of cockles
- Hypanis, an invalid name for a brush-footed butterfly genus, now Byblia
- Hypanis Valles, a set of valleys on Mars

== See also ==
- Beas (disambiguation)
