= Bea (surname) =

Bea is a surname. Notable people with the surname include:

- Aisling Bea (born 1984), Irish actor, comedian, and writer
- Augustin Bea (1881–1968), cardinal of the Roman Catholic Church
- Carlos Bea (born 1934), American federal judge
- José Beá (born 1942), Spanish comic book artist
- José Alfredo Bea (born 1969), Spanish sprint canoer
- Nancy Bea (1936–2025), American stadium organist
- Sebastian Bea (born 1977), American rower
