= Marcos "Barrão" DaSilva =

Marcos "Barrão" DaSilva (born 1961) is a Brazilian capoeira mestre (master) and founder of Grupo Axé Capoeira, which has schools worldwide. He began Grupo Axé officially in 1982 in Vancouver and since has had schools established around the world.

== First Mestre: Mestre Pirajá ==
Marcos "Barrão" DaSilva was born in Recife in 1961 into a state of poverty. He displayed an early talent for the drums, with which he earned his keep as a lad. At the age of 13, Mestre Pirajá (who was taught by his brother, a student of Mestre Bimba) took young Marcos under his wing and started to teach him Capoeira. An academy capoeirista by trade, Mestre Pirajá taught Barrão the discipline and techniques of Capoeira.

== Legacy ==
Mestre Barrão began to enter tournaments and became the Brazilian Champion in the National Capoeira Championships in Rio de Janeiro. He opened his school, Grupo Axé Capoeira, in 1982. In 1987, he was given the rank of 1st Degree Mestre by Pirajá. He then moved to Vancouver and opened an academy there. In 2007, he launched an academy in his hometown of Recife and he currently resides there.

Mestre Barrão has been invited to teach and conduct workshops and batizados all over the world. He is the recipient of many awards. He was instrumental in re-introducing a dance known as Coco de Roda.

He continues to contribute to the development of Capoeira and passes on his philosophy to all 20,000 members of his school.
