= MIRCEN =

UNESCO-supported network of microbial resource centres

- Microbial Resources Centers
- Abbreviation: MIRCEN
- Type: International scientific network
- Headquarters: International network
- Region served: Worldwide
- Affiliations: UNESCO, World Federation for Culture Collections

MIRCEN (Microbial Resources Centers) is an international network of microbiology and biotechnology centres established with support from UNESCO.

== See also ==
- UNESCO
- World Federation for Culture Collections
- Culture collection
- Biotechnology
