= National Collection of Pathogenic Fungi =

The National Collection Of Pathogenic Fungi (NCPF) is one of four collections, alongside ECACC, NCPV and NCTC, which make up PHE culture collections. NCPF was founded at the London School of Hygiene and Tropical Medicine in 1946, and now holds more than 4000 strains of fungi and yeast, most of which are available for sale and distribution worldwide. The collection has now moved to Bristol where all strains are able to be authenticated by the Mycology Reference Laboratory before sale and distribution. In the UK, it is the only collection to specialise in pathogenic fungi, making it integral for supply for research.

NCPF also hold training courses for the identification of pathogenic fungi as well as multiple other services which are available for view on the PHE culture collections website.
