= Irwin screen =

In the fields of toxicology and pathology, the Irwin screen is utilised to determine whether the subject(s) show adverse effects from a course of pharmaceutical treatment or environmental pollution. It is an observational methodology.

== History ==
Mice were first used systematically to determine a drug's central nervous system side effects by S. Irwin in 1962 and then again in 1968. Its use in the pharmaceutical industry has become ingrained since then, as below.

The National Academy of Sciences issued in 1975 a position paper on the "Principles for Evaluating Chemicals in the Environment." This paper influenced government and academic circles, and was adopted by e.g. Brimblecombe for his study of atmospheric arsenic levels. The critical review in 1982 by Mitchell and Tilson, caused the US EPA to develop guidelines for several behavioural tests including a test series based on the Irwin Screen, named the Functional Observational Battery (FOB) by Sette in 1989. In 1998, the FOB was published in the late 1990s as EPA Human Health 870 Series Test Guidelines, and in praxis the Irwin screen and the FOB "overlap and to some extent are interchangeable."

The American batteries were harmonised with the OECD's from the same era. Similar tests on food chemicals were recommended by the FDA in their Red Book. Behavioural test batteries are now required for new drugs by the S7A group of the International Council for Harmonisation of Technical Requirements for Pharmaceuticals for Human Use (ICH).

== Interchangeability with FOB ==
The Irwin screen was as of 2010 in the pharmaceutical industry almost exclusively used with lab mice, whereas the FOB, or some modification thereof, was used with lab rats and other nonrodent species, such as rabbits, dogs, guinea pigs and nonhuman primates.

== Sample checklist ==
A sample Irwin screen includes overt behavior observations and autonomic observations:

Overt Behavior

- increased activity
- decreased activity
- sedation
- tremor
- convulsions
  - myoclonic
  - tonic/clonic
- straub tail
- stereotypy
- increased exploration
- decreased exploration
- ataxia
- weakness
- catalepsy
- pain threshold (tail pinch)
- loss of righting reflex
- writhing (i.p. administration)

Autonomic Observations

- piloerection
- diarrhoea
- exophthalmos
- salivation
- vasoconstriction
- vasodilatation
- cyanosis
- lacrymation
- ptosis
- miosis
- mydriasis
- hypothermia
