= INS Beas =

The following ships of the Indian Navy have been named INS Beas:

- INS Beas (1958) was a Type 41 Leopard-class frigate launched in 1958, commissioned in 1960 and broken up in 1992
- INS Beas (2000) is a Brahmaputra-class guided-missile frigate launched in 2000
