= University of Las Palmas de Gran Canaria =

Public university in Gran Canaria, Canary Islands

- Universidad de Las Palmas de Gran Canaria
- Type: Public
- Established: 1989
- Rector: Lluís Serra Majem
- Academic staff: 811
- Administrative staff: 837
- Students: 22,707
- Location: Juan de Quesada, nº 30, Las Palmas de Gran Canaria, Province of Las Palmas, Canary Islands, 35001, Spain
- Nickname: ULPGC
- Website: www.ulpgc.es

The University of Las Palmas de Gran Canaria, also known as the ULPGC (Spanish Universidad de Las Palmas de Gran Canaria) is a Spanish public university located in Las Palmas de Gran Canaria, the capital city of Gran Canaria island. It is the university with the most students in the Canary Islands. It consists of five campuses: four in Gran Canaria (Tafira, Obelisco, San Cristóbal and Montaña Cardones) and one in the island of Lanzarote, with Tafira being the largest. The university was created in 1989 after many years of petitions from the people of Gran Canaria. The university was incorporated through the University Reorganization Act of 1989. ULPGC was created as the aggregation of the teaching centres of former "Universidad Politécnica de Canarias", focused on engineering (industrial, civil, electronics and computer), and the centres from neighbouring Universidad de La Laguna that were located in Las Palmas province.

This University of Las Palmas de Gran Canaria has an important university community of foreign students, being the first university in the Canary Islands and among the first in Spain to receive Erasmus students.

The University of Las Palmas de Gran Canaria, in the academic year 2019/2020, has 1,648 teachers and researchers, 143 research staff in projects, 109 research staff in training, 40 honorary doctors and 837 members and a total of 20,356 students.

== Academic programs ==
The university offers 41 bachelor's degrees, 25 Master's degrees, and 13 PhD programs to over 22,006 students.

The fields offered to cover all the five areas of knowledge, Sciences, Arts and Humanities, Health Sciences, Social and Law Sciences, and Architecture and Engineering.

The university has a Moodle-based virtual campus giving service to all traditional classroom-based teaching and specially to 5 fully on-line grade titles and 4 post-graduate programs. According to a popular Spanish newspaper (El País), the ULPGC uses their online platform in an outstanding way.

According to a popular newspaper ranking, the ULPGC placed 34th out of the 48 public universities in Spain (El Mundo newspaper study). In Spain, public universities overtake private ones. Also, the ULPG is in the position 804th of the world ranking.

== Teaching and research staff ==
The university conducts research in several fields, especially in biomedicine, electronics and computer sciences, and marine sciences. Since 1989, research groups at ULPGC have been awarded approximately 2000 research grants (competitive funding from the Spanish government and from international sources, mainly EU Science programs, a living testament to its academic achievement). As a result, the university has produced more than 3000 articles in peer-reviewed and non-peer-reviewed journals, as well as a number of books and magazine articles.

== University Institutes and Excellence in research ==
ULPGC Research Institutes

- University Institute of Cybernetic Science and Technology
- University Institute of Applied Microelectronics
- University Institute for Animal Health and Food Security
- Institute of Intelligent Systems and Numerical Applications in Engineering (IUSIANI)
- University Institute for Technological Development and Innovation in Communication (IDeTIC)
- University Institute of Tourism and Sustainable Development (TIDES)
- University Institute of Oceanography and Global Change (IOCAG)
- University Institute of Text Analysis and Applications (IATEXT)
- University Institute in Biomedical and Health Sciences (IUIBS)
- University Institute of Aquaculture and Sustainable Marine Ecosystems (IU-ECOAQUA)
- University Institute for Environmental Studies and Natural Resources (i-UNAT)

The university institutes are the highest body of research management at the university. ULPGC highlights international research in various fields such as marine science, health, energy, economy and tourism, water and ICT around the sea, as evidenced by the granting of the mention of Campus of Excellence “Tricontinental Atlantic Campus” by the Government of Spain.

The Institute of Tourism and Sustainable Economic Development -Tides-http://tides.es leading the tourism research at the ULPGC has contributed to rank the ULPGC as the top 1 university in the European Union in tourism research scientific productivity. shanghairanking. Tourism and Hospitality ULPGC is the 1st in Iberoamerica in Hospitality research scientific productivity. In tourism research, ULPGC highlights in this ranking in some specific research topics: "Destination Marketing and Management", 2nd in the World (sharing the position with 4 more universities); and "Image and Branding", 4th in the World. The neurotourism lab “Emoturlab”Emoturlab has been certified by the European Union as an Advanced Technology Center in Tourism, leading different European projects such as EuroemoturEuroemotur.

== Conferences ==
ULPGC is the main host and co-host of several international conferences. Mainly:

- International Conference on Computer-Aided Systems Theory
- Nature and Tourism International Conference

In 2005, this university hosted the MoodleMoot Spain conferences. Many universities have followed the example of the ULPGC in online education.

In 2009, the ULPGC has been the co-host for the GUADEC and Akademy 2009 conferences, joining these two leading software conferences in the same place for the first time.

== ULPGC store ==
A store was opened at the university on November 25, 2014. It is located between the "Las Casitas" cafeteria and the Student Information Service (SIE). The building has two floors and the different items that can be purchased with its own and commercially registered brand are displayed: ULPGC (University of Las Palmas de Gran Canaria).

== Football ==
From 1994 to 2011, the university had a football club that played in the spanish football divisions. The team would achieve consecutive promotions to reach the Segunda División B, the third highest division in Spain at the time, playing the 1998-99 season, only 4 years after being created. Two years later, the team would make history, as they got promoted to the Segunda División in 2000-01, the second highest division of the spanish football, becoming the first university club to reach such division and becoming a professional club, and also being the third team from the Canary Islands to reach the Segunda División (after Tenerife and Las Palmas). Despite being relegated in the same year, the club's achievement wouldn't be matched until 16 years later, when UCAM Murcia CF reached the same division in 2016-17. The club would get dissolved in 2011 due to financial problems.
