= Screening cultures =

- Purpose: test to identify infection

Screening culture is a type a medical test that is done to find an infection. Screening cultures are often performed to find infections that do not have signs and symptoms.

== Types of screening cultures ==
Perinatal Group B Streptococcal Disease comes from an intrauterine infection of the fetus from the spread of Group B Streptococcus from the vagina of a colonized woman who is typically asymptomatic. Medical studies show that prenatal screening cultures reduce the incidence of Perinatal Group B Streptococcal Disease. Studies of single institutions or health maintenance organizations show institutions with a culture-based screening policy have close to 90% of delivering women with documented GBS screening, and close to 90% of GBS-positive women received intrapartum antibiotics. Cost-effectiveness analyses of the screening- and risk-based strategies have indicated that although the initial costs associated with specimen collection and processing make the screening strategy more expensive than the risk-based approach, the overall cost savings due to disease prevention do not differ importantly between strategies.

Intensive care units of major hospitals routinely provide nasal, groin or axilla swabs for screening of Methicillin-resistant Staphylococcus aureus (MRSA)or Multi-resistant organisms (MRO).
