= Spanish Patent and Trademark Office =

Agency

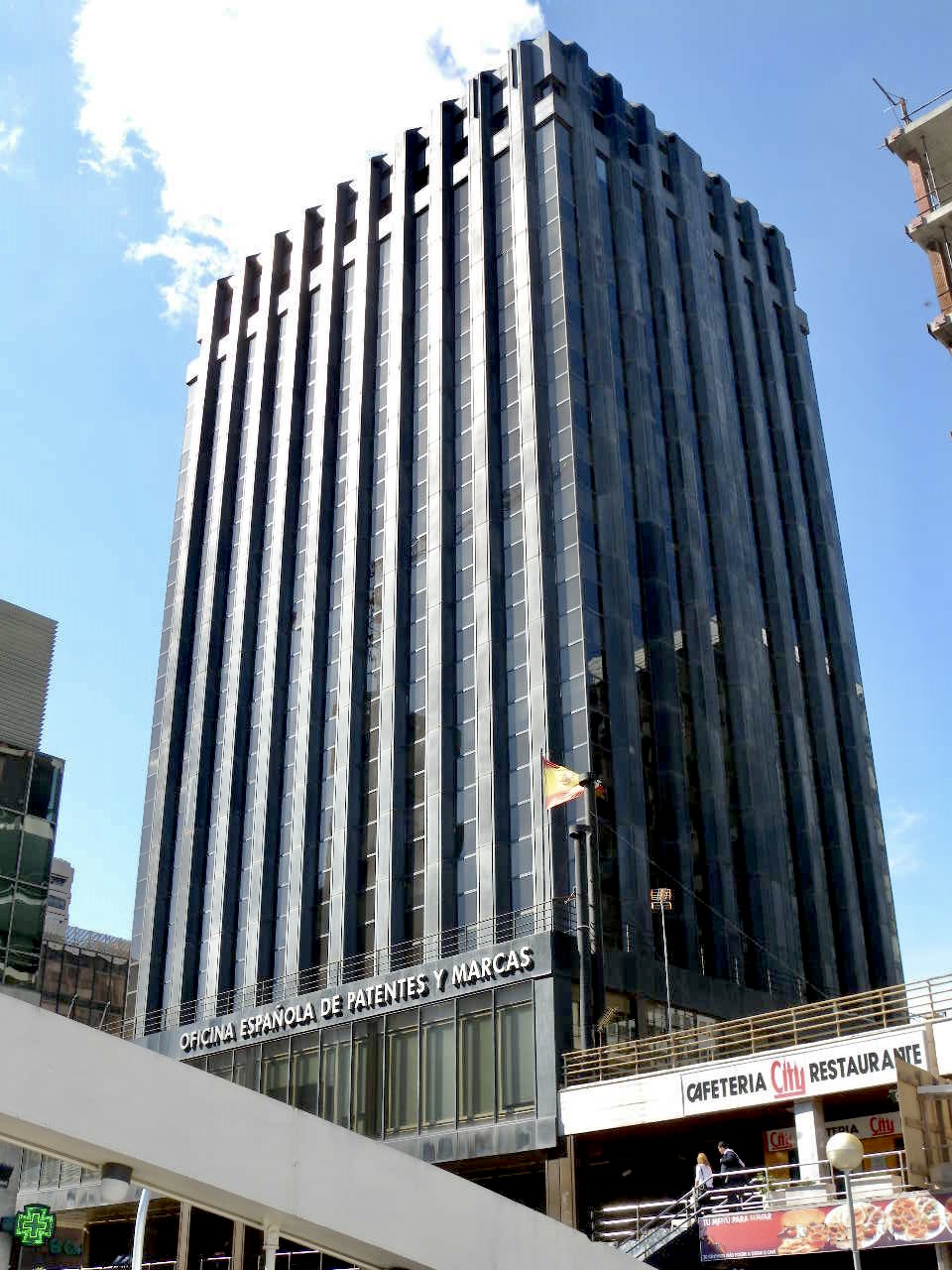
Seat of the OEPM, in Madrid

The Spanish Patent and Trademark Office (Spanish: Oficina Española de Patentes y Marcas, sometimes abbreviated SPTO or OEPM) is an autonomous agency of the Ministry of Industry, Trade and Tourism of Spain. The Spanish Patent and Trademark Office, created in the 19th century, is in charge of patents in Spain. It also acts as International Searching Authority (ISA) and International Preliminary Examining Authority (IPEA) under the procedures established by the Patent Cooperation Treaty (PCT). Since June 2018, its director general has been José Antonio Gil Celedonio.
