= Leibniz Institute DSMZ =

German microbial culture collection

Leibniz Institute DSMZ - German Collection of Microorganisms and Cell Cultures GmbH
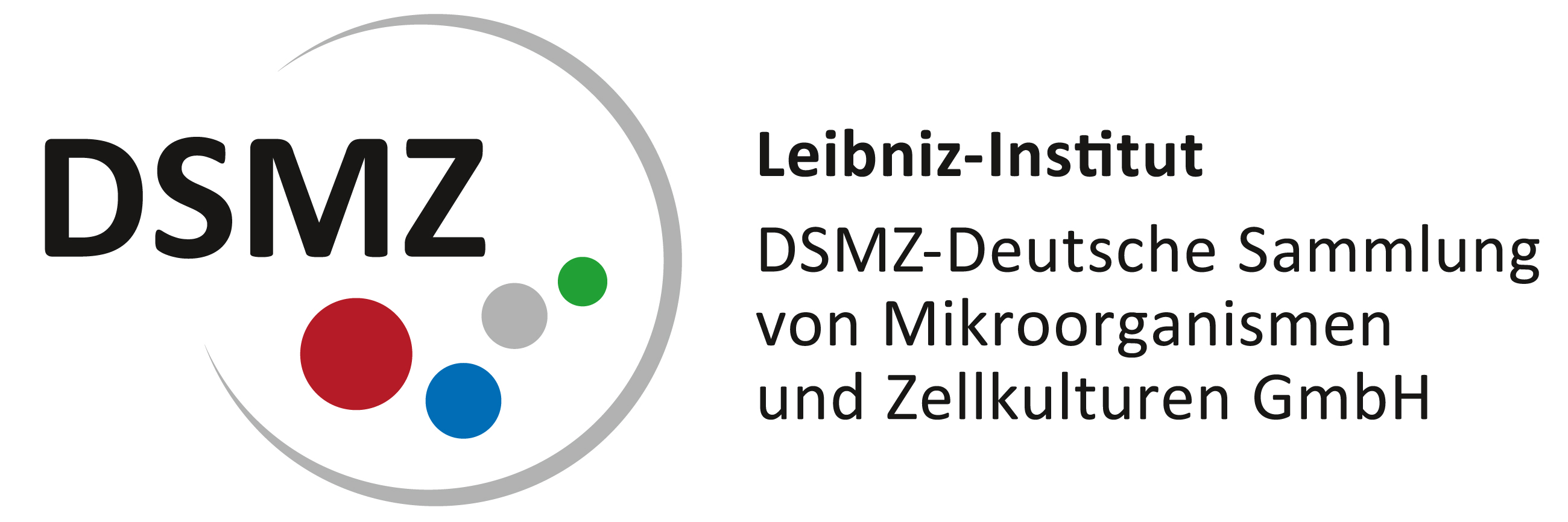
- Abbreviation: DSMZ
- Predecessor: Collection of Microorganisms Göttingen (SMG); German Collection of Microorganisms (DSM)
- Formation: 1969
- Type: Independent, non-profit organization
- Purpose: National culture collection
- Location: Braunschweig
- Fields: Microbiology, Cell Biology
- Leader: Yvonne Mast (interims scientific director), Bettina Fischer (administrative director)
- Affiliations: Leibniz Association
- Staff: 228 (status: January 2024)
- Website: www.dsmz.de

The Leibniz Institute DSMZ - German Collection of Microorganisms and Cell Cultures GmbH (German: Leibniz-Institut DSMZ-Deutsche Sammlung von Mikroorganismen und Zellkulturen GmbH), located in Braunschweig, is a research infrastructure in the Leibniz Association. Originally a culture collection for microbes (DSM), the DSMZ has expanded to provide cell cultures, online bioinformatic services, and offline analysis services. It also hosts research projects.

As of 2021, DSMZ is the world's most diverse collection of bioresources with 75,000 different accessions. These include microorganisms (including more than 32,000 bacterial strains, 690 archaeal strains, 7,000 strains of yeasts and fungi) as well as more than 840 human and animal cell cultures, over 1,500 plant viruses, over 940 bacteriophages, and 250 plasmids (status 2021).

Since 2010, the scientific director of the Leibniz Institute DSMZ has been Jörg Overmann, a microbiologist with a PhD from the University of Konstanz. He holds a professorship in microbiology at the Technical University of Braunschweig. Since August 2018, he has led the institute with leadership with Bettina Fischer as administrative director.

== History ==
| Year | Event |
|---|---|
| 1969 | Establishment Collection of Microorganisms Göttingen (SMG) in the Department of Nutritional Physiology of Microorganisms with Microbial Bank (Administrative Head D. Claus) at the Göttingen Institute of Microbiology of the Society for Radiation Research |
| 1973 | Official name: German Collection of Microorganisms (DSM) |
| 1974 | Recognition as official depository by the German Patent Office |
| 1976 | DSM is spun off and run independently at the Institute of Microbiology |
| 1979 | Transfer to the Society for Biotechnological Research Braunschweig (Director D. Claus) |
| 1981 | Recognition as international depository for patent purposes according to the Budapest Treaty |
| 1987 | Establishment of plant cell lines and human and animal cell cultures as new collection areas |
| 1988 | Renaming to German Collection of Microorganisms and Cell Cultures. DSMZ becomes a GmbH (limited liability company) with the state of Lower Saxony as sole shareholder |
| 1990 | Plant virus collection added |
| 1996 | Promotion of the DSMZ as a Blue List institution and subsequently member of the Leibniz Association |
| 2010 | Establishment of the collection-independent research area Department of Microbial Ecology and Diversity Research |
| 2011 | Renaming to Leibniz Institute DSMZ-German Collection of Microorganisms and Cell Cultures GmbH |
| 2014 | Establishment of the research department Microbial Genomics as part of DSMZ's participation in the German Center for Infection Research |
| 2016 | Establishment of the new collection department Bioresources for Bioeconomy and Health Research |
| 2018 | DSMZ becomes the first registered collection for the implementation of the Nagoya Protocol in the EU |
| 2020 | Move-in of the Bioresources for Bioeconomy and Health Research Department into the new Center for Drug and Functional Genomics Research. Successful evaluation by the Senate of the Leibniz Association. |

== Structure ==
Nearly 200 scientists and technical staff currently work at the DSMZ. It is a company/non-profit organization recognized as a public benefit. In 2018, the Leibniz Institute DSMZ was recognized as the world's first registered collection under Directive (European Union) 511/2014, providing all users with the necessary legal certainty in the handling of their bioresources in accordance with the Nagoya Protocol. The DSMZ is a partner in international organizations such as the European Culture Collections' Organisation (ECCO), the World Federation for Culture Collections (WFCC) and the Global Biodiversity Information Facility (GBIF).

== Functions ==
DSMZ is a global service provider with more than 10,000 customers in over 80 countries and provides microorganisms and cell cultures for university, non-university and industrial research in the life sciences. It also serves as a patent and security depository for biological material (a total of over 11,700 bioresources) in accordance with the guidelines of the Budapest Treaty. It is the only patent depository for bioresources in Germany. The DSMZ only holds bioresources in biosafety level 1 and 2.

=== Web services ===
In 2010, DSMZ established the GGDC (Genome-to-Genome Distance Calculator) webserver, which produces a value analogous to DNA-DNA hybridization using GBDP (Genome Blast Distance Phylogeny) algorithm. It can compare whole genomes as well as single genes. GGDC 2 was published in 2013. GGDC 3 was published in 2021.

In 2012, the freely accessible database BacDive (The Bacterial Diversity Metadatabase) was established, which is maintained and curated by the DSMZ. The database contains information on a wide variety of strains of prokaryotes; in 2016, information on 53,978 strains could be found there, and by 2021, the number had increased to more than 82,000. For the cell lines provided by DSMZ, there is an analogous "DSMZCellDive" service.

In 2017, DSMZ established VICTOR, which classifies viral genomes according to GGDC distances compared to genomes in a reference ICTV classification database. In 2021, DSMZ established TYGS (Type Strain Genome Server), which allows an uploaded bacterial genome to be classified according to its dDDH value relative to type strain genomes in the server's database.

A new version of the List of Prokaryotic names with Standing in Nomenclature (LPSN) was established at DSMZ in 2020. LPSN received close integration with TYGS in 2021.

== Departments ==
In addition to the research departments Microbial Ecology and Diversity Research and Microbial Genome Research, the eight departments of the DSMZ include the collection departments Microorganisms, Bioresources for Bioeconomy and Health Research, Human and Animal Cell Lines and Plant Viruses as well as the departments Analytics and Bioinformatics, IT and Databases. The establishment of independent junior research groups (as of 2021: VirusInteract (interactions of plant viruses with their hosts) and Microbial Biotechnology) provides qualification opportunities for young scientists conducting research on selected, current topics.
