= Culture Collection (University of Gothenburg) =

Swedish microbial culture repository

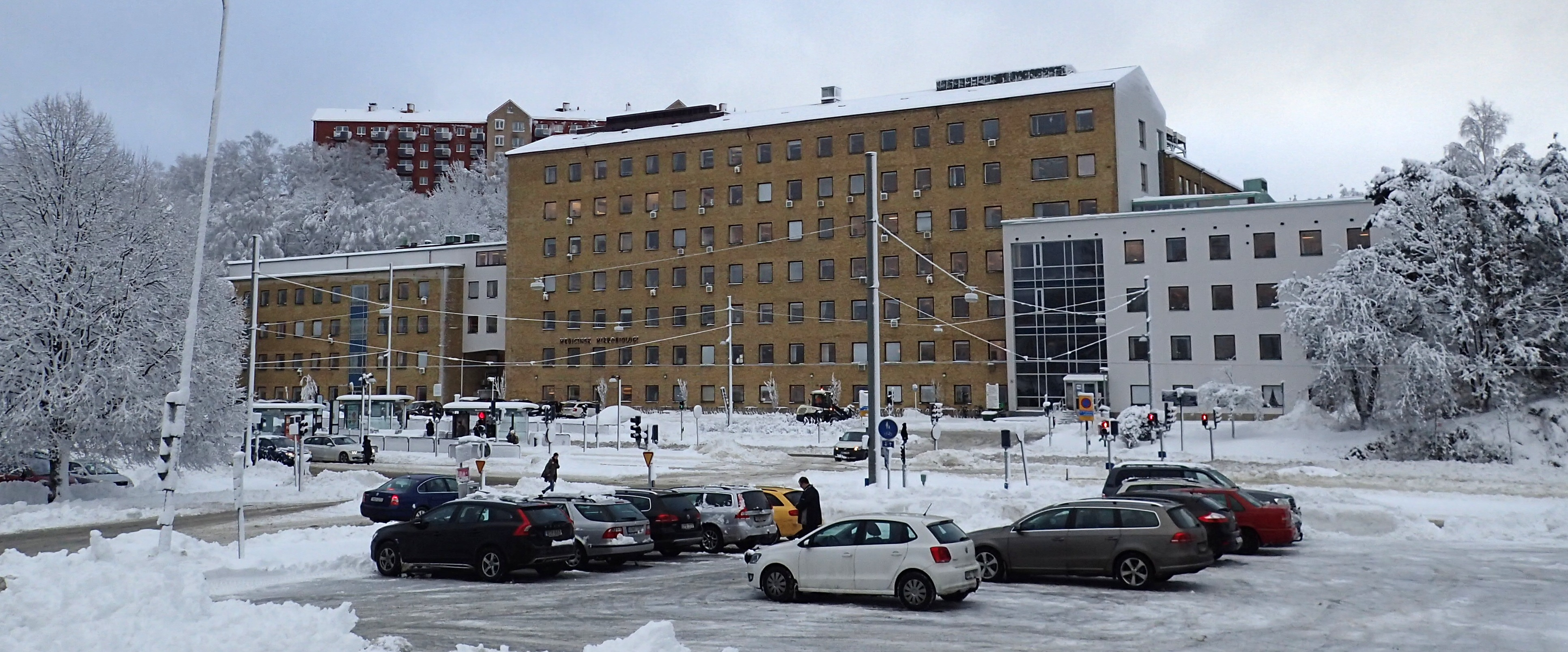
Building where the Culture Collection University of Gothenburg (CCUG) is located.

Culture Collection University of Gothenburg (CCUG) is a Swedish microbial culture repository located in Gothenburg (Sweden) established by Enevold Falsen in 1968 and affiliated with the University of Gothenburg. The current curator is Prof. Dr. Edward R. B. Moore and it maintains bacterial, filamentous fungal and yeasts cultures, but it does not hold extremophiles and does not dispatch the most hazardous organisms classified in biosafety level 3. The CCUG has been devoted to the identification of bacteria.

The CCUG represents one of the largest public collection of bacteria in Europe. As of 2025, the collection comprised more than 78,000 registered bacterial strains, of which nearly 22,000 were documented in its online database. The collection focuses primarily on clinically relevant bacteria and includes approximately 4,000 type strains.

The CCUG also performs research and development of novel methods for rapid diagnosis of infectious diseases mainly by using molecular, genomic and proteomic approaches.
