= World Federation for Culture Collections =

International organization for microbial cultures

The World Federation for Culture Collections is an international body formed under the umbrella of the International Union of Biological Sciences and a Federation within the International Union of Microbiological Societies. The WFCC operates as a clearing house for information on collections of microbiological specimens. It supports the development, maintenance and establishment of culture collections. The WFCC bylaws were published in 1972 in the International Journal of Systematic Biology (Int. J. Syst. Bacteriol., 22: 406–409, 1972) and updated several times since.

One of its main activities is the support of the WFCC-MIRCEN World Data Centre for Microorganisms. There are over 2.4 Million cultures and 676 culture collections under the purview of the WFCC.

The WFCC is governed by an executive board and through a series of committees. Members of the executive board include scientists from Australia, Belgium, Brazil, China, Germany, India, Japan, Morocco, The Netherlands, the Russian Federation and the United States.

== Global significance ==
The WFCC is the main international body that coordinates the activities of culture collections around the world. Their activities include lobbying for support for collections, preventing the loss of collections, promoting the use of collections, and coordinating international regulations relating to the shipping and use of biological materials.

The WFCC is a Multidisciplinary Commission of the International Union of Biological Sciences (IUBS) and a Federation within the International Union of Microbiological Societies (IUMS).

In 1977 the WIPO established the Budapest Treaty on the International Recognition of the Deposit of Microorganisms for the Purposes of Patent Procedure. There are 42 International Depository Authorities worldwide where microorganisms may be deposited for patent purposes. The WFCC coordinates the International Congress of Culture Collections. The most recent meeting was the 13th International Conference on Culture Collections and it was held in Beijing, China. It was hosted by the Institute of Microbiology of the Chinese Academy of Sciences (IMCAS). The WFCC communicates via a regular newsletter.

The WFCC works with the OECD to promote Best Practice Guidelines for Biological Resource Centers.

Culture collections are key players in the preservation of micro-biodiversity. On October 12, 2014, the Nagoya Protocol under the Convention on Biological Diversity entered into force. Members of WFCC are constantly improving their data management and policies to match the principles and rules set in the CBD and NP. These efforts started in 1999 by the publication of the MOSAICC Code of Conduct. It goes on with the TRUST initiative presented during the 1st Meeting of the Parties of the Nagoya Protocol.

== See also ==
- European Culture Collections' Organisation
- Microbial Culture Collection

== Sources ==
- World Federation for Culture Collections Xth International Congress, Int J Syst Bacteriol, Lapage, 22(4): 404
- World Federation for Culture Collections (Library of Congress)
