= Biorepository =

Place in which biological materials are stored and preserved

A biorepository is a facility that collects, catalogs, and stores samples of biological material for laboratory research. Biorepositories collect and manage specimens from animals, plants, and other living organisms. Biorepositories store many different types of specimens, including samples of blood, urine, tissue, cells, DNA, RNA, and proteins. If the samples are from people, they may be stored with medical information along with written consent to use the samples in laboratory studies.

== Purpose ==
The purpose of a biorepository is to maintain biological specimens, and associated information, for future use in research. The biorepository maintains the quality of specimens in its collection and ensures that they are accessible for scientific research.

== Operations ==
The four main operations of a biorepository are; (i) collection (ii) processing, (iii) storage or inventory, and (iv) distribution of biological specimens.

(i) Collection or accession occurs when a specimen arrives at the biorepository. Information about the specimen is entered into the laboratory information management system ("LIMS"), which tracks information about all of the specimens in the biorepository. Typical information linked to a specimen would be the specimen's origin and when it arrived at the biorepository.

(ii) Processing of specimens is standardized to minimize variation due to handling. Processing may prepare the specimen for long-term storage. For example, DNA samples are processed into a salt buffer (aqueous solution) of proper pH to stabilize the DNA for storage.

(iii) Storage and inventory are where all samples are held prior to being requested via a distribution request. The inventory system is composed of sample holding boxes and the boxes are stored in freezers of various types depending on the sample storage requirements.

(iv) Distribution is the process of retrieving one or more samples from the biorepository inventory system.

== Standard Operating Procedures ==
Standard Operating Procedures (SOPs) play a crucial role in the biorepository industry. There are a number of reasons why they are important:

- SOPs reduce variability within the samples and storage processes by providing standardized guidelines for proper storage and care.
- Biospecimen samples should closely resemble biospecimens in their natural state. SOPs help ensure that.
- SOPs provide a standardized framework of how to conduct operations within a biorepository. They ensure seamless and reliable processes be implemented throughout operations.

== Biological Resource Centres ==
The OECD has issued best practice guidelines for biorepositories, which are referred to as biological resource centres. They are defined by the OECD as follows:

"Biological Resource Centres are an essential part of the infrastructure underpinning biotechnology. They consist of service providers and repositories of the living cells, genomes of organisms, and information relating to heredity and the functions of biological systems. BRCs contain collections of culturable organisms (e.g. micro-organisms, plant, animal and human cells), replicable parts of these (e.g. genomes, plasmids, viruses, cDNAs), viable but not yet culturable organisms, cells and tissues, as well as databases containing molecular, physiological and structural information relevant to these collections and related bioinformatics."

== Examples of Biorepositories in the United States ==
=== Cell Line Repositories ===
- The National Institute of Neurological Disorders and Stroke (NINDS) Human Cell and Data Repository maintains a collection of cell lines to advance the study of neurological disorders.
- The National Institute on Aging (NIA) Aging Cell Repository facilitates research into the mechanisms of aging by providing cell lines collected from subjects of different ages.
- The National Institute of General Medical Sciences (NIGMS) Human Genetic Cell Repository is collection of well-characterized human cells for use in biomedical research.

=== Sample Repositories ===
- The Intermountain Healthcare Biorepository is a collection of over 4.5 million biological samples preserved in formalin and embedded in paraffin wax.
- The J. Craig Venter Institute Human Reference Genome makes available DNA samples from J. Craig Venter, whose genome has been sequenced and assembled.
- The Centers for Disease Control and Prevention (CDC) Genetic Testing Reference Material Program (GeT-RM) maintains DNA samples for use in molecular genetic testing. These samples are from diseases such as Huntington Disease, Cystic Fibrosis, Fragile X Syndrome, Alpha-Thalassemia, and Muenke Syndrome.

== See also ==
- Biobank
- Biological database
- Gene bank
- Genetic fingerprinting
- Genomics
- Genotype
