= European Culture Collections' Organisation =

The European Culture Collections' Organisation (ECCO) is a European non-profit organisation which promotes the collaboration and exchange of ideas and information on all aspects of culture collection activity. Corporate members of ECCO are microbial resource centres of countries with microbiological societies affiliated to the Federation of the European Microbiological Societies (FEMS).

As of 2025, ECCO's members consist of 90 public biological resource centers from 24 European countries.

The organisation of the European Culture Collections' Organisation (ECCO) was established in 1981.

== See also ==
- World Federation for Culture Collections

== Sources ==
- ECCO
- B. E. Kirsop, C. P. Kurtzman, T. Nakase, D. Yarrow, Living Resources for Biotechnology : Yeasts, 1988, p. 208
- D. L. Hawksworth, B. E. Kirsop, S. C. Jong, Filamentous Fungi (Living Resources for Biotechnology), 1988, pp. 182–183
