= ATCC (company) =

American biological culture collection

American Type Culture Collection
- Established: 1925
- Headquarters: Manassas, Virginia
- Website: atcc.org

ATCC or the American Type Culture Collection is a nonprofit organization which collects, stores, and distributes standard reference microorganisms, cell lines and other materials for research and development. Established in 1925 to serve as a national center for depositing and distributing microbiological specimens, ATCC has since grown to distribute in over 150 countries. It is now the largest general culture collection in the world.

== Products and collections ==
ATCC's collections include a wide range of biological materials for research, including cell lines, microorganisms and bioproducts. The organization holds a collection of more than 3,000 human and animal cell lines and an additional 1,200 hybridomas. ATCC's microorganism collection includes a collection of more than 18,000 strains of bacteria, as well as 3,000 different types of animal viruses and 1,000 plant viruses. In addition, ATCC maintains collections of protozoans, yeasts and fungi with over 7,500 yeast and fungus species and 1,000 strains of protists.

== Services ==
In addition to serving as a biorepository and distributor, ATCC provides specialized services as a biological resource center. Individuals and groups can employ a safe deposit service for their own cell cultures, providing a secure back-up for valuable biomaterials if required. ATCC also is able to retain secure samples of patented materials and distribute them according to instructions and approval of the patent holder. ATCC also provides biological repository management services to institutions, agencies and companies wishing to outsource the handling of their own culture collections. ATCC also manages BEI Resources, who provides reagents, tools and information needed in research on microbes.

ATCC also serves to set standards for biological reagent and assay quality. These standards are used by the U.S. Food and Drug Administration and the U.S. Department of Agriculture, as well as organizations such as AOAC International, the Clinical and Laboratory Standards Institute, the U.S. Pharmacopeia, and the World Health Organization. ATCC-produced standards are used in a wide range of applications including the development of therapeutic and diagnostic medical products, food safety, water and environmental testing, and to obtain actionable forensic information.

== Facilities ==
ATCC headquarters and production facilities are based in a 126,000 sq ft (11,700 m^{2}) building in Manassas, Virginia. This includes the 18,000 sq ft (1,700 m^{2}) biological material repository which contains 200 freezers to store biomaterials, including vapor-phase liquid nitrogen freezers, mechanical freezers, and cold rooms for storage at 4 °C. Electricity at the repository is backed up by on-site generators. The facility also includes 35,000 sq ft (3,300 m^{2}) of laboratory space.

== Databases ==
ATCC has created and continues to maintain several public databases used for cell line authentication and research. In 2016, ATCC signed an agreement with the National Institute of Standards and Technology (NIST) to establish standards and a database for short tandem repeat (STR) sequences in mouse and human cell lines. In 2019, ATCC began hosting the ATCC Genome Portal, a database of authenticated, reference genome assemblies and associated metadata for microbial strains held within its collection. The ATCC Genome Portal now exceeds 6,000 reference genomes for bacteria, fungi, viruses, and protists including genome assemblies for type-strains. In 2022, ATCC entered into a partnership with QIAGEN to create a commercial database of RNA-seq data produced by ATCC for all human and animal cell lines held within ATCC's biorepository.

== Customers ==
ATCC products and services are used both nationally and internationally by researchers in academia and government, as well as private industry. Over 80% of ATCC’s customers come from academia and industry – 42% from universities and colleges and 41% from private industry. Government customers comprise 6% of the organization’s total. Three-quarters of ATCC customers are from the United States, while the remaining 25% are international customers. ATCC maintains authorized distributors in Europe, Japan, Australia, New Zealand, Hong Kong, Singapore, South Korea, Israel, and Taiwan, and makes other international shipments directly from its Virginia facilities. Among the industries represented ATCC’s customer base are the pharmaceutical, biotechnology, agricultural and diagnostics industries, as well as food, beverage and cosmetics makers and reference and testing laboratories.

The ATCC also has working links with several other international culture collections, such as the UK's National Collection of Plant Pathogenic Bacteria (NCPPB), Belgian Co-ordinated Collections of Micro-organisms (BCCM), the Deutsche Sammlung von Mikroorganismen und Zellkulturen (DSMZ, or German Collection of Microorganisms and Cell Cultures), the Japanese Collection of Research Bioresources (JCRB), and others.

== Controversy ==
ATCC, along with the Centers for Disease Control, sold or sent biological samples of anthrax, West Nile virus and botulism to Iraq up until 1989, which Iraq claimed it needed for medical research. The Departments of Commerce and of Defense had approved the shipments. A number of these materials were used for Iraq's biological weapons research program, while others were used for vaccine development. For example, the Iraqi military settled on the American Type Culture Collection strain 14578 as the exclusive anthrax strain for use as a biological weapon, according to Charles Duelfer.
