= Japan Collection of Microorganisms =

Japanese microbial culture collection

Japan Collection of Microorganisms (JCM) is a culture collection of microorganisms in Japan. It is a semi-governmental collection maintained by RIKEN BioResource Center and it is located in Tsukuba, Ibaraki Prefecture. JCM was initiated in 1980 with the purpose of serving as a repository of microorganisms. As of April 2012 JCM has about 20,700 microbial strains, including approximately 8,300 strains of bacteria (including actinomycetes), 370 strains of archaea and 4,800 strains of fungi including yeasts (limited to organisms classified in Risk Group 1 or 2). JCM accepts deposition of strains based on their appearance in scientific journals or accepted manuscripts.

One can search the JCM database online for microorganisms using various key words such as scientific name, JCM accession number, IAM or other culture collection accession number, culture media, strain data etc. JCM publishes its own printed catalogue once every 3 year. The first catalogue was published in 1983 and the current edition is the 10th edition published in 2007.

JCM cultures are available for a fee. The culture fee, in case of an ampoule, for commercial organizations is 10800 Japanese yen and the fee for non-profit organizations is 5400 Japanese yen.
