= O Barqueiro =

Coordinates: 43.7362°N 7.7055°W

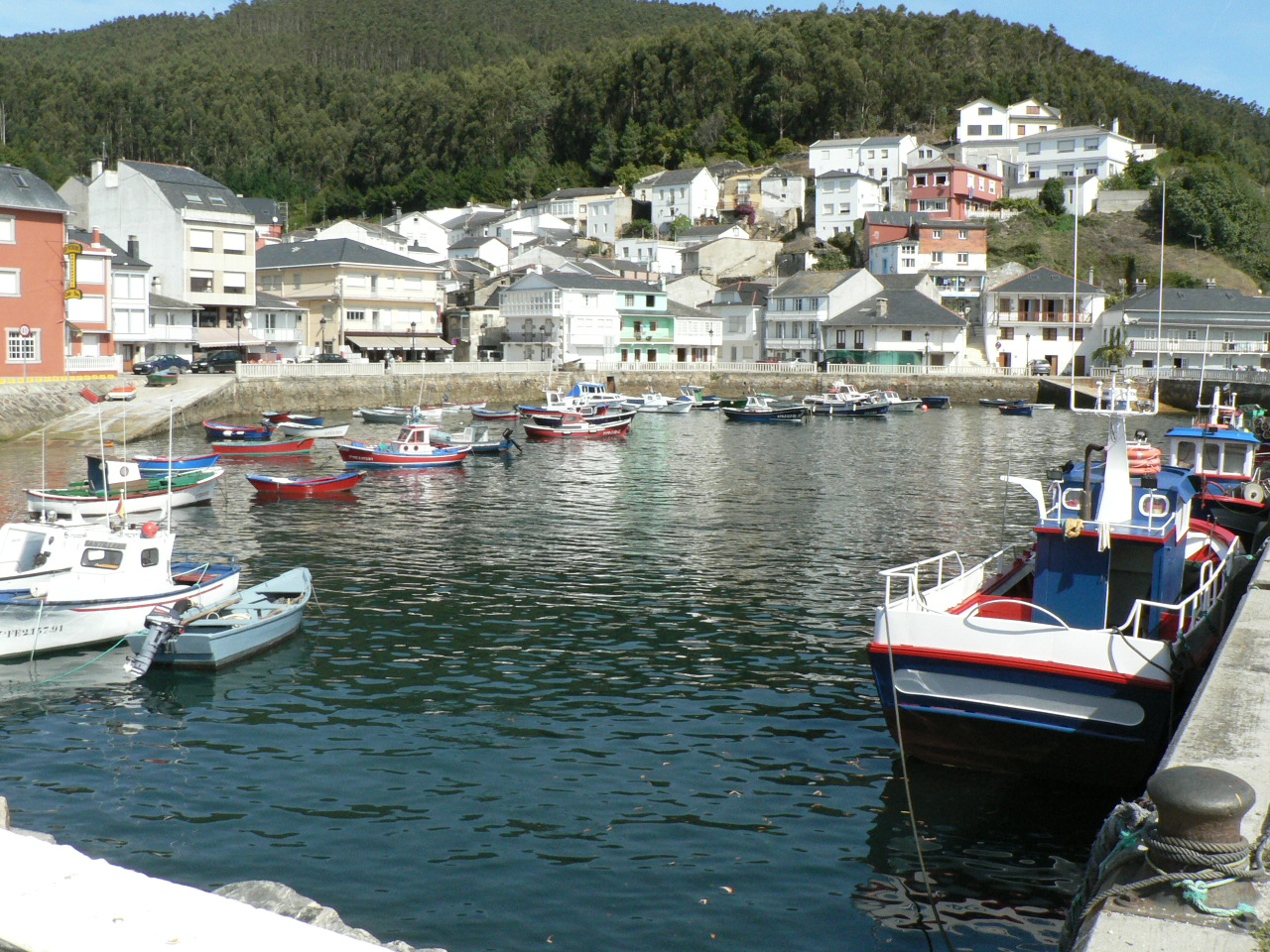
The harbor at O Barqueiro

O Barqueiro (officially, O Porto do Barqueiro) is a parish and a port belonging to the city council of Mañón in Ferrolterra in North-western Spain in the province of A Coruña, in the autonomous community of Galicia.

== Toponimy ==
The port's name is in reference to a boat captain (in Galician, "barqueiro"), who used to take people and goods from one shore of the Ria do Barqueiro to the other in O Vicedo, until a bridge was built in 1901.

== Geography ==
Located south of the peninsula of Bares, in the southern foothills of the Facho de Maeda mount. Its shores are the eastern boundary of the Ortegal comarca and the province of A Coruña. It is situated deep within the Ría del Barquero formed by River Sor Mañón's estuary, between the Arealonga beach's sand embankment (in Vicedo), depending on tide levels, and the Punta de Barra, to the north of the port.

O Barqueiro started as a coastal settlement around a primitive port, where the boat that crossed the river anchored until 1901, when the metallic bridge allowed for constant access between both provinces. From this core modern buildings started to be built uphill, making use of the rare flat terrain and of the existing communication network.

== History ==
=== 1700s-1800s ===
In the 18th century, the port already was as active as Bares', and there were conflicts over the price of fish, the supply of the nearby villages and the amount of the taxes to be paid to the government officials in Mondoñedo and the church. The port received shallow river boats and focused specifically on fishing sardines. In the 19th century, when Galicia was organized in four provinces, the port became part of the council of Mañón.

The port grew at a good pace throughout the 1800s; according to Pascual Madoz' dictionary, in 1847 the parish of Mogor, to which the port belonged, had 1015 inhabitants, three sardine processing plants, 6 textile plants, 4 flour mills, a store and 2 taverns. In a census in 1860, the population was around 1000 people. In 1895 the port was declared a safe haven and a 116-meters long seawall was built.

=== 1900s ===
The inauguration of the metal bridge in 1901, despite making the ferries who gave the village its name superfluous, allowed for a great improvement in the communications between the comarcas of Vivero and Ortigueira. The village's higher part, popularly known as O Mesón [the big table], became the administrative and services center of the Mañón district. The municipal court and the region's administration were installed there, and in 1920 two schools were opened, one for girls and the other for boys. The port received boats which unloaded salt, coal and took on wood and kaolinite.

In 1930, there was a railroad connection to the village, it having its own train station, Barqueiro Station; it also already had electricity. The canned sardine industry had, however, disappeared, though a sawmill, three windmills and an electric mill remained.

=== 2000s ===
Thanks to its colorful houses arranged over the port, and the connection of the Sor River with the ocean, the port has become a touristic destination, so much so that tourism, together with fishing and clam harvesting are now its main sources of income.

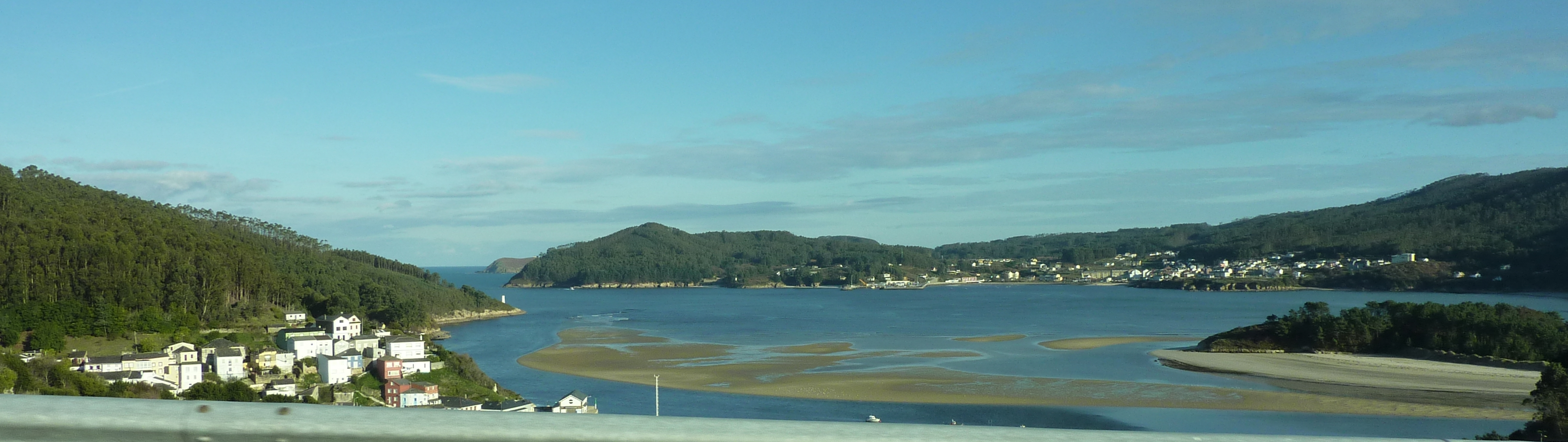
Ria of Barqueiro (river Sor Mañón)

== Economics ==
=== Clams ===
Clam harvesting acquired importance after the 1950s, peaking between the 1970s and 90s. In 1975, there were 322 harvesters on land, and 110 on boats. The activity, traditionally complementary and belonging to family economics, had become a solid source of income. Production, however, began to fall in 1997, something which can be attributed to some public works around the port which changed the sea level and the way the tide worked. In 2007, there were only 15 clam harvesters in the village; in the 2020s, activity began to focus on the harvest of the pacific oyster, an invasive species.

=== Infrastructure ===
Besides the narrow line railroad, Porto do Barqueiro receives a branch of the AP-9 highway, the AC-862, which links Ferrol to Vivero, and also the AC-100 to Bares.

There are three bridges over the River Sor, the metallic bridge from 1901, which nowadays is only used by pedestrians; a rail bridge from the 1960s, and a bridge for cars inaugurated in the 1980s as part of the AC-862 road.
