= San Martiño =

Uninhabited island in Galicia, Spain

San Martiño (Saint Martin) is a small island off the north coast of Galician, Spain, at the mouth of the Sor River and the beginning of the Ria de Vigo estuary of O Barqueiro. It originally formed from a meander of the Sor River. It is part of the 3-island Cíes Islands archipelago, which also includes the islands of Monteagudo and Faro. The island belongs to the parish of As Negradas, municipality of O Vicedo.

== History ==
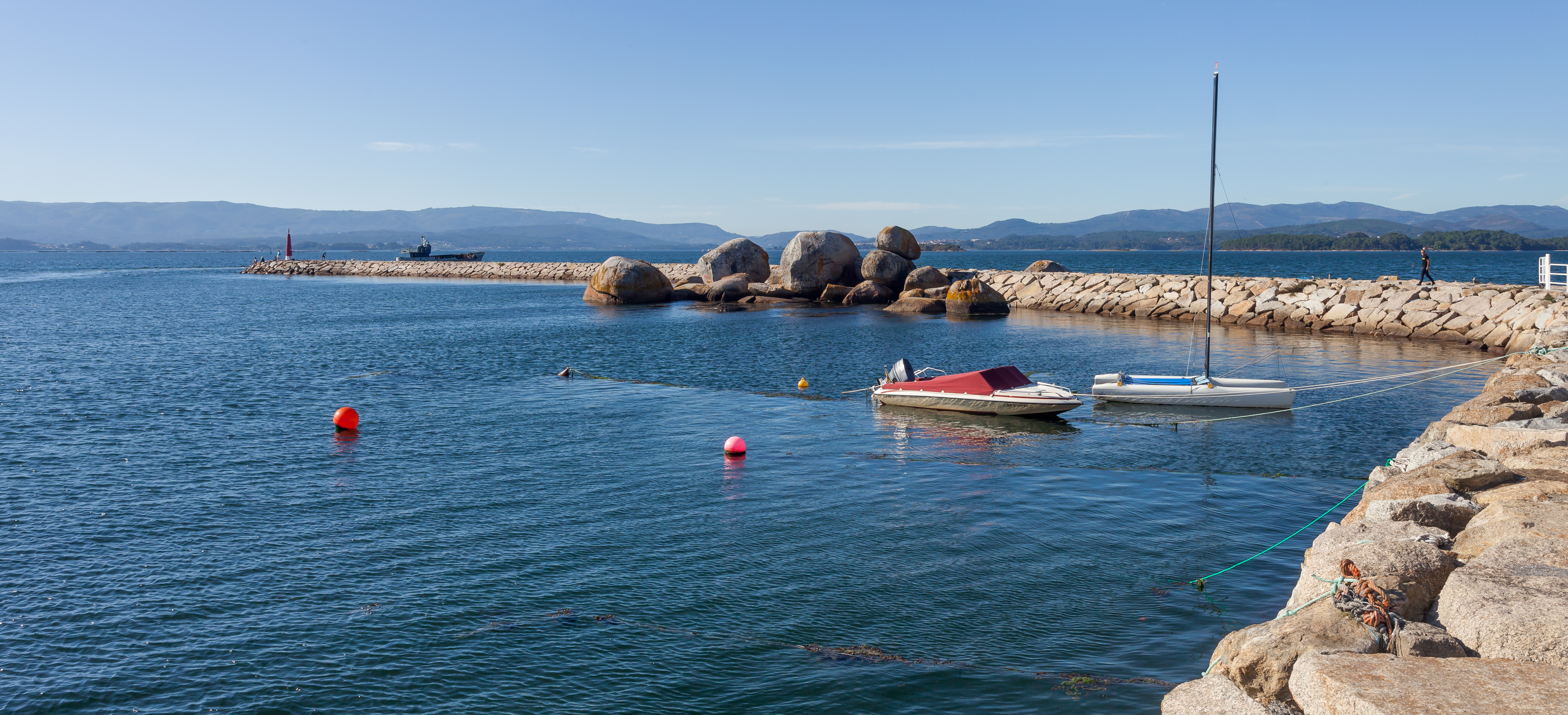
Port of Vilaxoán

Humans have inhabited the Cíes Islands since the Paleolithic era. The island had a Celtic settlement (Castro) on the hill in the middle of the island. This settlement is called "Cova dos Mouros" by the local people.

During the Middle Ages there was a Benedictine convent that lasted until the 15th century, Maria Vizoso being its last prioress.

The island has fertile, well-cultivated soil. It is currently the island with the most forest mass (eucalyptus) in all of Europe. In 1980 the Cíes Islands gained national park status, and in 2002 the Spanish Parliament established the Land and Marine National Park of the Atlantic Islands, which includes all three islands.
