= Xosé Artiaga =

Galician painter and engraver (born 1955)

Xosé Artiaga Barreira
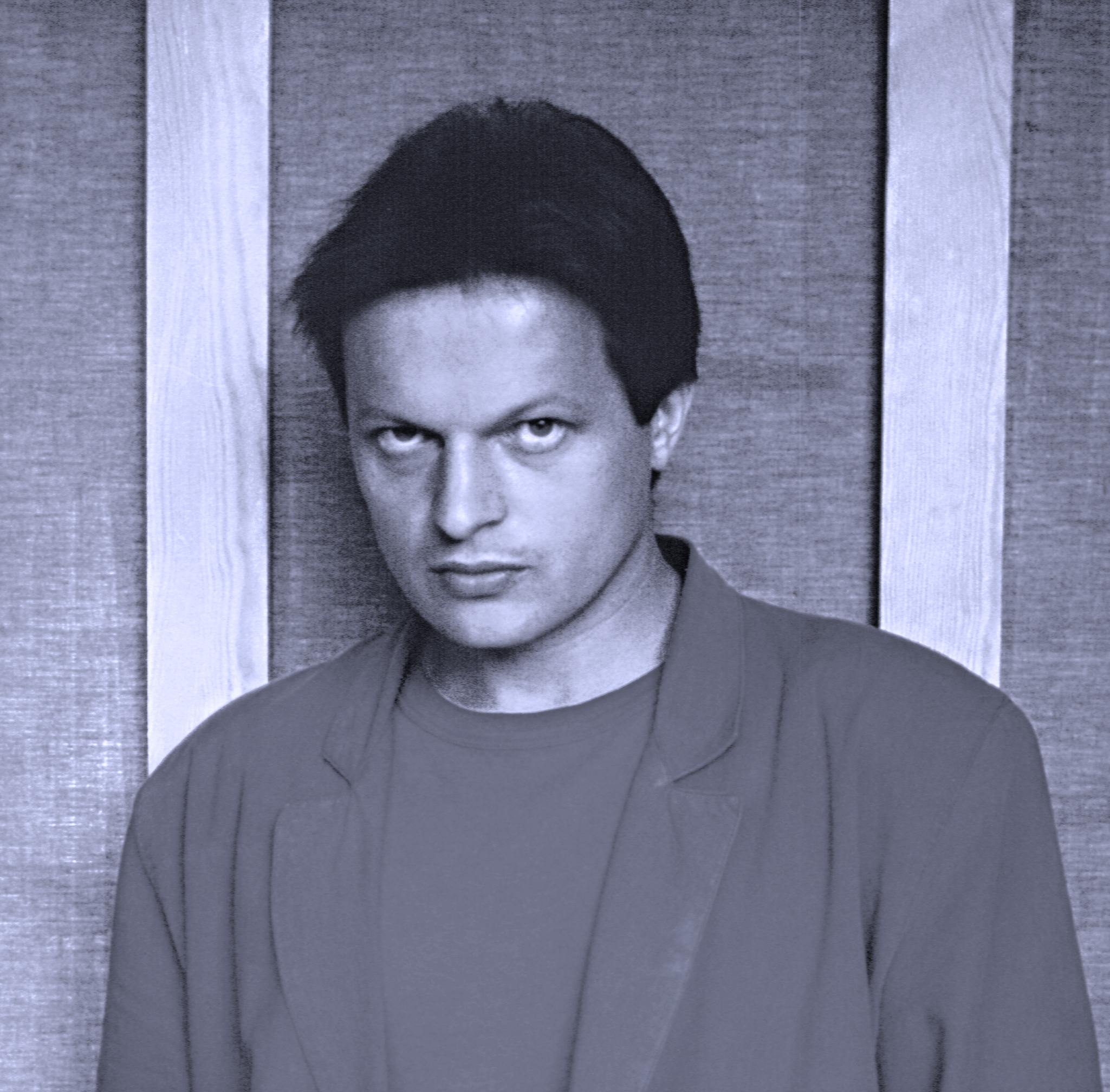
- Xosé Artiaga, photographed in his own studio in 1990
- Born: July 10, 1955 (age 71); Mondoñedo, Galicia, Spain
- Education: Escuela Superior de Bellas Artes de San Fernando, Madrid
- Known for: painting
- Awards: L'Oreal Painting Award

Xosé Artiaga Barreira (Galician: [ʃoˈse aɾtjaɣa bareiɾa]; born July 10, 1955), is a Galician painter, engraver, photographer and multimedia artist, as well as teacher of drawing.

== Career ==
Xosé Artiaga Barreira was born at Mondoñedo, a little town in the North of the province of Lugo, July 10, 1955. He studied at Escuela Superior de Bellas Artes de San Fernando, Madrid. In 1983 he presented the validation thesis for the degree at the Faculty of Fine Arts (Complutense University of Madrid) with the title La cultura castreña (trans. The castro culture), supervised by professor Juan Fernando de Laiglesia.

His art passed through a figurative intimacy, technically characterized by the materiality of his painting and color, to an increasingly greater abstraction and schematism from the end of the 1980s. His most important series in the 1990s and the beginning of the new century are "Presencias" (Presences, 1990–93), "Reencontres" (Remeetings, 1994; where he began to experiment with photography) and "Utopías" (Utopias, 2000; where he began to use digital elements).

He regularly has participated in numerous art contests, several times presented by the Emilio Navarro Gallery from Madrid. At the age of twenty-six, he presented the work Personaje de madrugada (trans. Character in the early morning) at the IX National Art Contest convened by the Caja de Ahorros de Guadalajara, being chosen among the thirty-three finalists, whose works were exhibited from October the 30th of 1981. His first individual exhibition took place in April 1985 at the exhibition hall of the Provincial Deputation of Lugo, and his first exhibition in Madrid was at Columela Gallery in 1988. He has also exhibited his work at Art Basel, ARCO, Salón de los 16, Mostra Gas Natural Fenosa, EXPO Chicago and Premio de Pintura L'Oreal, among others. He has also collaborated with different journalistic media, such as Diario 16 (Madrid), El Progreso (Lugo), Faro de Vigo (Vigo), El Correo Gallego (Santiago) and the magazine Monfadal (Mondoñedo).

Artiaga has also done mural work for buildings of the Xunta de Galicia in Lugo, Viveiro and Xermade.

In 1994 he was awarded with the VII Premio Constitución de Pintura (trans. Constitution of Painting Award) of the Government of Extremadura, and in the same way he has obtained the L'Oreal Painting Award in several occasions.

He has work in exhibition or in the art collection of the Museo Provincial de Lugo, the Colección de Arte da Xunta de Galicia (trans. Xunta de Galicia Art Collection; in Santiago), the Colección Banco de España (trans. Bank of Spain Collection, in Madrid), the Centro Galego de Arte Contemporánea (in Santiago), the Mondoñedo City Hall, the Cultural Rioja (in Logroño), the Colección Comisionado do V Centenario de Galicia (trans. Commissioner of the V Centenary of Galicia), the Colección Junta de Extremadura, the Alcorcón City Hall and the Community of Madrid.

In February 1996, the first issue of the magazine Arte y Parte, subtitled "bimonthly magazine of artistic information", was published, a benchmark in the international field of Latin visual arts, directed by the Galician art critic Miguel Fernández-Cid, who has repeatedly analyzed Artiaga's work since meeting him in 1984. In that first number, Fernández-Cid acknowledged the attention and collaboration given to, among others, Xosé Artiaga in the development of this journalistic project. In 1998, four of his works, belonging to the Reencontres series, were chosen to illustrate in said magazine one of the stories in the Palabras para el arte section (trans. Words for art).

In 2017 he was one of the three invited artists selected for the VII New Artists Meeting "Cidade da Cultura" to give a master class, together with María Cañas and Berta Álvarez Cáccamo.

He is the father of fellow artist and critic José Artiaga Rodero and of professor and art curator Saudade Artiaga Rodero.

== Art criticism ==
As the critic Miguel Fernández-Cid says his work reflects a vindication to his place of origin, explaining that «his paintings have a cold appearance, but they evoke a selective look, an attitude that is both intense and reflective», also defining him as an «emotional rationalist».

Mainly from the middle of the 1990s, Artiaga experiments more and more regularly with other supports. So, for example, with photography. The critic David Barro points out in this sense that «he changes the support, but not the flag, he doesn't work as an opportunist, but relies on photography with the purpose of achieving results that painting does not achieve, never to betray it».

== Work as a teacher ==
Apart from his artistic career, he has worked as an art teacher in different educational centers. In 1984 he applied to join the Corps of High School Professors, being appointed at the beginning of 1986. He worked as a drawing teacher at IES Galileo Galilei (in Alcorcón, from the 1987–88 academic year), at IES Iturralde (in Madrid) and at Vilagarcía de Arousa.

In parallel to his artistic concerns and his commitment to the protection of animals, he has developed initiatives in schools that aim to encourage them both artistic creativity and love for animals.

== The Artiaga Foundation ==
On July 8, 2015, he created the Artiaga Foundation in Vilagarcía de Arousa, classified as of cultural interest by the Xunta de Galicia in the same year. This foundation aims to spread culture through art, contribute to the cultural, social and scientific development of Galicia, promote the study and conservation of Xosé Artiaga's work, as well as the search for new artists, and protect abandoned animals. The board of trustees is chaired by the artist and completed in the positions of vice president and secretary by his two sons, José and Saudade Artiaga Rodero.

To raise funds for this foundation, in 2017 he organized an itinerant collective exhibition entitled "AAN in ART", which brought together works by 42 Galician plastic artists, passing through the Torrente Ballester Foundation (Santiago de Compostela) in March and in July through the Pazo de Sabadelle (Chantada).

== Exhibitions ==
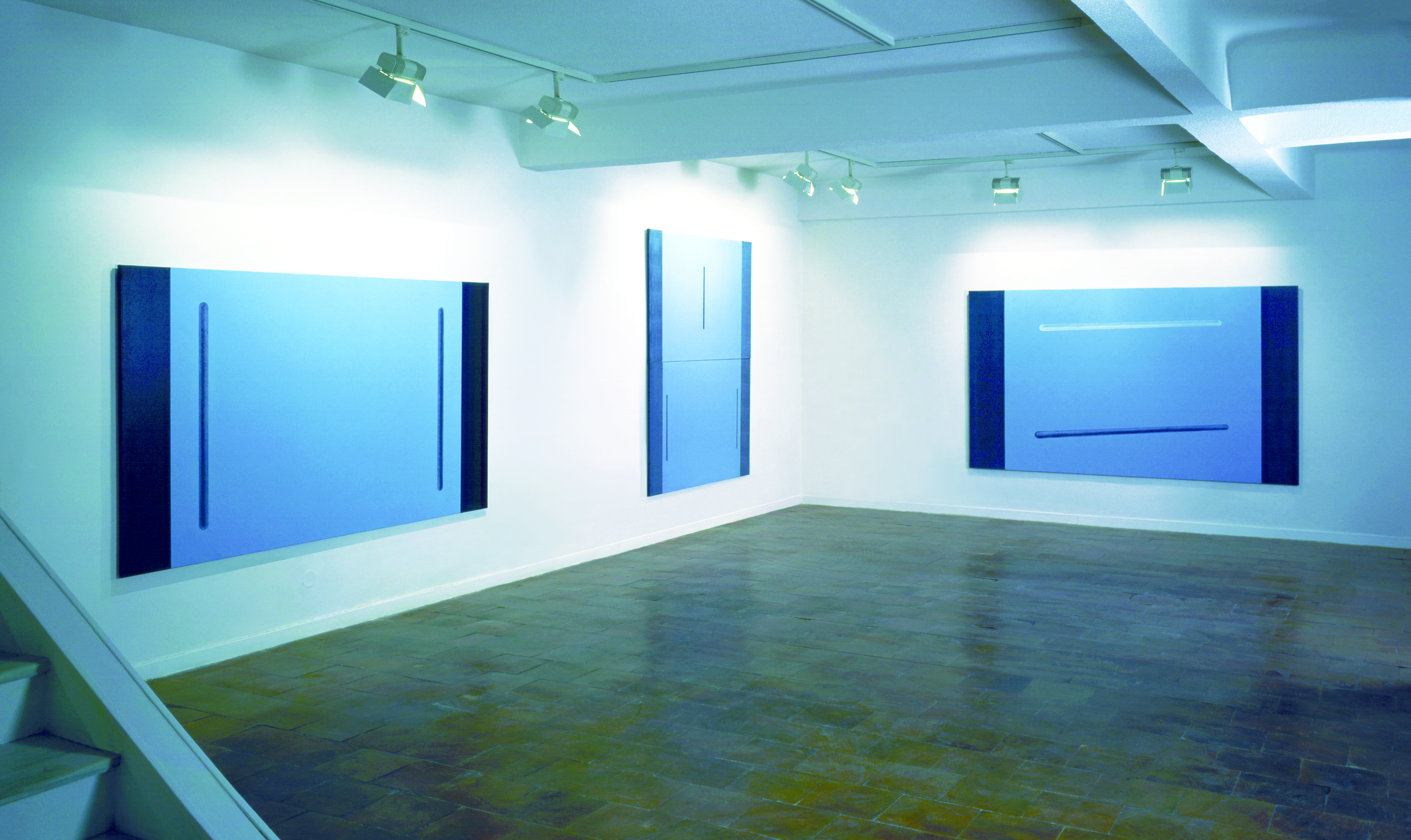
Partial view of "Presencias", 1990's exhibition

- IX Certamen Nacional de Arte Caja de Ahorros de Guadalajara (Guadalajara, October 1981)
- José Artiaga. Grabados, ADART (Madrid, January 1983)
- José Artiaga. Dibujos, Librería Abril (Madrid, February 1983)
- Exhibition hall of the Deputación Provincial de Lugo (Lugo, April 1985)
- Sala Pena Trapero (Mondoñedo, April 1985)
- V Salón Nacional de Artes Plásticas (Alcobendas, Madrid, 1985)
- I Bienal de Pintura Fundación Araguaney (Santiago de Compostela, December 1985)
- 1990 (A Coruña, Santiago and Vigo, March 1986)
- Galería Sargadelos (Santiago de Compostela, March 1986)
- Galicia: chove sobre mollado, UIMP (Palacio de la Magdalena, Santander, August 1986)
- Dezasete Pintores de Lugo (Buenos Aires, Argentina, Lugo, Pontevedra and Santiago, 1986/87)
- IX Bienal de Arte (Pontevedra, August 1987)
- Sala Casa da Parra (Santiago de Compostela, September 1987)
- Sala Durán Loriga (A Coruña, October 1987)
- Galería Columela (Madrid, April 1988)
- Revisión dunha década 1978–1988 (Santiago and Vigo, June/July 1990)
- II Bienal de Artes Plásticas Cultural Rioja (Logroño, July 1990)
- En la arena, Galería Emilio Navarro (Madrid, 1990)
- Presencias, Galería Emilio Navarro (Madrid, October 1990)
- IV Premios Constitución de Pintura (Badajoz and Cáceres, February/March 1991)
- 40 grados a la sombra, Galería Emilio Navarro (Madrid, 1991)
- II Mostra Unión Fenosa (A Coruña, July 1991)
- Alquilart (Madrid, 1991)
- XI Salón de los 16, Palacio de Velázquez and Centro de Arte Reina Sofía (Madrid, September 1991)
- VII Premio de Pintura L´Oréal, Casa de Velázquez (Madrid, October 1991)
- II Certamen de Pintura de la UNED, Casa de Velázquez (Madrid, January 1992)
- XI ARCO 92, through Galería Emilio Navarro (Madrid, February 1992)
- Galería Delpasaje (Valladolid, April 1992)
- Le printemps des arts, Créations 92-Espagne, Maison des Arts Georges Pompidou (Cajarc, France, April/May 1992)
- Chicago Internacional Art Exposition, through Galería Emilio Navarro (Chicago, United States, 1992)
- Art Basel 23' 92 (Basilea, Switzerland, June 1992)
- Pintores y Escultores Gallegos en la EXPO´92, Pavillón de Galicia (Seville, 1992)
- Artistas en Madrid, EXPO´92, Pabellón de la Comunidad de Madrid (Seville, 1992)
- XII ARCO 93, through Galería Emilio Navarro (Madrid, February 1993)
- Trazos e Camiños (A Coruña, Ferrol, Lugo, Ourense, Pontevedra, Santiago and Vigo, 1993)
- Cimal Arte Internacional 41 (Valencia, 1993)
- IV Bienal de Pintura Ciudad de Pamplona (Pamplona, March 1993)
- Ultreia (Lugo, 1993)
- XIII Certámenes nacionales Ciudad de Alcorcón (Alcorcón, Madrid, February 1994)
- Colección de Arte da Xunta de Galicia 1986–1993 (1995)
- III Certamen Nacional de Pintura La General (Granada, March 1995)
- IV Mostra Unión Fenosa (A Coruña, August 1995)
- XI Premio de Pintura L´Oréal, Centro Conde Duque (Madrid, October 1995)
- Mondoñedo: máis preto (Barcelona, Bilbao, A Coruña, Getafe, Mondoñedo, Santiago, Tréguier at Francia and Vigo, 1996/97)
- Galicia, 1900–1990, Galicia Terra Única, Hospital da Caridade (Ferrol, May 1997)
- A Galicia exterior, Galicia Terra Única, Estación Marítima (Vigo, May 1997)
- Galicia hoxe, Galicia Terra Única, Fundación Pedro Barrié de La Maza (A Coruña, 1997)
- V Mostra Unión Fenosa (A Coruña, August 1997)
- XIII Premio de Pintura L´Oréal, Centro Conde Duque (Madrid, October 1997)
- ¡Hasta la victoria siempre! Homenaje de los artistas gallegos al Ché, Galería Sargadelos (Santiago, December 1997)
- XIV Premio de Pintura L´Oréal, Centro Conde Duque (Madrid, October 1998)
- Monfadal 1 (Mondoñedo, December 1998)
- IV Bienal de Lalín (Lalín, province of Pontevedra, April 1999)
- VI Mostra Unión Fenosa (A Coruña, June 1999)
- Galería Bacelos. Exposiciones 1999–2000, Galería Bacelos (Vigo, 2000)
- Novas adquisicións, Centro Galego de Arte Contemporánea (Santiago, 2000)
- Monfadal 2 (Mondoñedo, November 2001)
- XAB: Trans (Lugo, December 2002)
- Marea negra (2003)
- Excéntrico, Museo Provincial de Lugo (Lugo, 2004)
- Ars Moenia (2004)
- Haciendo deporte, Galería Caracol (Valladolid, 2005)
- Art Salamanca/06, Galería Caracol (Salamanca, December 2005)
- Off / Fóra. Movementos imaxinarios entre Galicia e o Cono Sur, XXIX Bienal de Arte de Pontevedra (Pontevedra, July 2006)
- Noir (Cervo, Lugo, 2006)
- XAB, exhibitions hall of the Centro Cultural e de Servizos á Cidadanía de Cervo (Cervo, Lugo, January 2007)
- Fluxo e refluxo na mar da arte (2007)
- Art Salamanca/07, through Galería Caracol (Salamanca, 2007)
- Artesantander 2009, through Galería Caracol (Santander, 2009)
- AAN in Art (Santiago and Chantada, 2017)

== Bibliography ==
Press articles

- Soto, Juan (April 3, 1985). "Artiaga". El Progreso. Táboa Redonda (in Spanish). Lugo.
- Osorio, Carmen (April 14, 1985). "Vehemencia explosiva en la pintura de Artiaga". La Voz de Galicia (in Spanish).
- Trapero Pardo, José (April 14, 1985). "La transrealidad en la obra de Artiaga". El Progreso (in Spanish). Lugo.
- Fernández-Cid, Miguel (January 1986). Galería Buades (ed.). "José Artiaga". Buades, periódico de arte (in Spanish). No. 5. Madrid.
- Fernández-Cid, Miguel (1986). Aparente sencillez de la pintura. Galería Sargadelos. Catálogo de la exposición, marzo de 1986 (in Spanish).
- Sousa, José M. (March 5, 1986). "Pinturas de José Artiaga". El Correo Gallego (in Spanish). Santiago.
- Soto, Juan (March 5, 1986). "Artiaga". El Progreso. Táboa Redonda (in Spanish). Lugo.
- Huici, Fernando (March 14, 1986). "Artiaga". El País (in Spanish). Madrid.
- Fernández-Cid, Miguel (March 15, 1986). "José Artiaga expone en Santiago". Faro de Vigo. Artes e Letras nº 159 (in Spanish). Vigo.
- Pino, Concha (March 16, 1986). "El descubrimiento de Artiaga para la pintura gallega". La Voz de Galicia (in Spanish).
- Hacosta, Javier P. (March 16, 1986). "Arte: José Artiaga, obra fresca". La Voz de Galicia (in Spanish).
- García, Xosé Lois (April 17, 1986). Artiaga: trabajador de una pintura en libertad. Avant (in Spanish).
- Comesaña, Pilar (October 16, 1986). "La denuncia pictórica de Xosé Artiaga". Faro de Vigo (in Spanish).
- Fernández-Cid, Miguel (1987). Tensión e estrutura. Casa da Parra. Catálogo de exposición, setembro de 1987 (in Galician). Santiago.
- "Exposición pictórica de Xosé Artiaga". El Correo Gallego (in Spanish). Santiago. September 8, 1987.
- Castro, Antón (1987). Ser un mesmo. Galería Durán Loriga. Catálogo de exposición, outubro de 1987 (in Galician). A Coruña.
- Fernández-Cid, Miguel (1988). La pintura directa de José Artiaga. Galería Columela. Catálogo de exposición, abril de 1988 (in Spanish). Madrid.
- Jiménez, Pablo (May 6, 1988). "La voluntad narrativa de José Artiaga". El Punto (in Spanish).
- Huici, Fernando (May 14, 1988). "Lejos del Atlántico". El Pais (in Spanish). Madrid.
- Fernández-Cid, Miguel (August 25, 1989). "Madrid como argumento". Diario 16. Guía de Madrid nº 72 (in Spanish).
- Mirete, María Luisa (1990). "El arte al día". El Mueble (in Spanish). No. 342.
- Calvo Roy, Antonio (June 18, 1990). "Alquile un cuadro por horas". Época (in Spanish). No. 276. Madrid.
- Barnatan, Marcos R. (August 3, 1990). "El museo en la arena". El Mundo. Metrópoli nº 10 (in Spanish). Madrid.
- Fernández-Cid, Miguel (August 10, 1990). "La Playa de Madrid". Diario 16. Guía de Madrid nº 122 (in Spanish).
- Fernández-Cid, Miguel (September 10, 1990). "El desierto se despereza". Guía del Ocio (in Spanish). No. 769. Madrid.
- Huici, Fernando (1990). Tarea de despojamiento. Galería Emilio Navarro. Catalogo de exposición, octubre de 1990 (in Spanish).
- Marín-Medina, José (November 5, 1990). "Recién pintado". El Independiente (in Spanish). Madrid.
- Fernández-Cid, Miguel (November 9, 1990). "Una mirada suspendida". Diario 16. Guía de Madrid nº 135 (in Spanish).
- Danvila, José Ramón (November 19, 1990). "El purismo de la forma". Guía del Ocio (in Spanish). No. 779.
- Rubio Nomblot, Javier (November 19, 1990). "Xosé Artiaga: Presencias". El Punto (in Spanish).
- Castaño, Adolfo (July 4, 1991). "40 grados a la sombra". ABC (in Spanish). Madrid.
- Fernández-Cid, Miguel (August 23, 1991). "Colectivas con historia". Diario 16. Guía de Madrid nº 176 (in Spanish).
- Llorca, Pablo (August 31, 1991). "El XI Salón de los 16". Diario 16 (in Spanish).
- Fernández-Cid, Miguel (1991). La condición de la pintura. Salón de los 16. Catálogo del XI Salón, septiembre de 1991 (in Spanish).
- "Salón de los 16, once años de historia". Marie Claire (in Spanish). No. 48. Madrid. September 1991.
- Fernández-Cid, Miguel (September 13, 1991). "El XI Salón de los 16 abre la temporada". Diario 16. Guía de Madrid nº 179 (in Spanish).
- López, Ignacio (September 20, 1991). "Dieciséis artistas". Diario 16. Guía de Madrid nº 180 (in Spanish).
- Casado, David (September 20, 1991). "XI Salón de los 16". El Punto (in Spanish).
- Huici, Fernando (September 21, 1991). "El Salón en un Palacio". El País (in Spanish). Madrid.
- Fernández-Cid, Miguel (September 23, 1991). "Xosé Artiaga: imágenes quietas". Cambio 16 (in Spanish). No. 1035. Madrid.
- "Salón de los 16". Cambio 16 (in Spanish). No. 1036. Madrid. September 30, 1991.
- Calvo Serraller, Francisco (February 13, 1992). "Emociones duras en el itinerario español". El País (in Spanish). Madrid.
- Artiaga, Xosé (February 29, 1992). "Los días de la semana. Martes". Diario 16 (in Spanish). Madrid.
- Fernández-Cid, Miguel (April 16, 1992). "El pintor Xosé Artiaga presenta sus últimas obras en Valladolid". Diario 16 (in Spanish).
- Aragón Zumel, Concha (April 17, 1992). "Xosé Artiaga se introduce en una particular visión del concepto". Alerta (in Spanish).
- Fernández-Cid, Miguel (1992). Xosé Artiaga. Pintores Galegos na EXPO ’92. Catálogo da exposición, abril de 1992.
- Fernández-Cid, Miguel (1992). Xosé Artiaga. Publicación Artistas en Madrid, EXPO ’92, abril de 1992.
- González-Alegre, Alberto (1993). No hay periferia (nota sobre la pintura joven gallega). Cimal Arte internacional (in Spanish).
- Artiaga, Xosé (October 12, 1996). "Mondoñedo, ausencias y presencias". El Progreso (in Spanish). Lugo.
- Artiaga, Xosé (1997). Mondoñedo, en azul. Catálogo de la exposición Mondoñedo: máis preto (in Spanish).
- Olveira, Manuel (April–May 1997). Galicia Terra Única. Arte y Parte (in Spanish).
- Artiaga, Xosé (August–September 1998). La pérdida de la sombra. Arte y Parte (in Spanish).
- Garabal, David (2000). Xosé Artiaga. InteresArte (in Galician).
- Fernández-Cid, Miguel (2002). Por qué Xosé Artiaga. Museo Provincial de Lugo. Catálogo de la exposición Trans, diciembre de 2002 (in Spanish).

Books and catalogs

- Artiaga Barreira, José (1983). La cultura castreña (Mestría/doutoramento) (in Spanish). Universidad Complutense de Madrid, Facultad de Bellas Artes, Departamento de Historia del Arte y Pedagogía. p. 73. OCLC 1024883493.
- Xosé Artiaga (Casa da Parra, Santiago de Compostela, setembro 1987) (in Galician). Direción Xeral de Cultura e do Patrimonio Histórico-Artístico. 1987.
- José Artiaga (Columela Galería de Arte: Madrid, abril-mayo 1988) (in Spanish). Columela Galería de Arte.
- Artiaga. Catálogo de la exposición celebrada en la Galería Navarro. Madrid, octubre / noviembre 1990 (in Spanish). Galería Navarro. 1991.
- Calvo Serraller, Francisco (1991). Enciclopedia del arte español del siglo XX (in Spanish). Mondadori. ISBN 978-84-397-1793-5.
- Fernández-Cid, Miguel; Ferro, Manuel (1992). Artistas en Madrid. Pabellón de la Comunidad de Madrid. Expo '92 (in Spanish). Consejería de Educación y Cultura, Comunidad de Madrid. ISBN 84-7506-361-6.
- Ríos Torre, Miguel (1995). Desde mil novecentos trinta e seis: homenaxe da poesía e da plástica galega aos que loitaron pola liberdade (in Galician). Ediciós do Castro. ISBN 978-84-7492-977-5.
- González Ananín, Eduardo (1995). Rol de Cantárida (in Galician). Ediciós do Castro. ISBN 978-84-7492-828-0.
- Artiaga, Xosé (1997). Galicia Terra Única. Galicia 1900-1990. Ferrol, Ferrerías da Armada e Hospital da Caridade, 24 de xuño-outubro 1997 (in Spanish). Xunta de Galicia. ISBN 84-453-1940-X.
- Fernández-Cid, Miguel (2002). Trans (12 diciembre-21 enero 2003). XAB (in Spanish). Lugo: Museo Provincial de Lugo.
- "Artiaga Barreira, Xosé". Gran Enciclopedia Galega Silverio Cañada (in Galician). Vol. 4. El Progreso / Diario de Pontevedra / Silverio Cañada. 2003. p. 34. ISBN 84-87804-06-3.
- Rueda Alonso, Margarita (coord.) (2003). Guía de artistas de Galicia (in Spanish). Xunta de Galicia. Consellería de Cultura. ISBN 84-453-3507-3.
- Duque, Félix (2004). Excéntrico (catálogo exposición, 28 de xullo-15 de setembro 2004, Museo Provincial de Lugo) (in Galician). Deputación Provincial de Lugo. ISBN 84-8192-269-2.
- Matalobos, Manuel Celso (coord.) (2006). "Xosé Arteaga". Papel e pincel. Pintores e escultores do IES Lucus Augusti (PDF). Lugo: IES Lucus Augusti. pp. 399–401.
- "Artiaga Barreira, Xosé". Diciopedia do século 21 (in Galician). Vol. 1. Edicións do Cumio / Editorial Galaxia / Ediciós do Castro. 2006. p. 205. ISBN 978-84-8288-942-9.
- Artiaga, Xosé (2007). Concellaría de Cultura do Concello de Cervo (ed.). XAB (do 4 de xaneiro ao 15 de febreiro de 2007, sala de exposicións do Centro Cultural e de Servizos á Ciudadanía de Cervo) (in Galician).
- Garrido Moreno, Antonio (2008). Fluxo e refluxo no mar da arte (Sala de exposicións de Sargadelos). Museo Provincial de Lugo. ISBN 978-84-8192-397-1.
- Artiaga Barreira, Xosé; Cordal, Xabier; Fernández, José Luis (2009). Arredor do debuxo. Retrospectiva de Celso Dourado no Museo Provincial de Lugo. Servizo de Publicacións da Deputación de Lugo / Museo Provincial de Lugo. ISBN 978-84-8192-408-4.
