= Creximil =

Village in Galicia, Spain

Coordinates: 43.709°N 7.698°W

Creximil is a small village located in San Miguel das Negradas (O Vicedo), in the Sor estuary in Spain.

== Etymology ==
This toponym may come from *(villa) Wistimiri, the form in genitive of Wistimirus.
