= As Negradas =

As Negradas may refer to either of two municipalities in the autonomous community of Lugo, Galicia, Spain:

- San Miguel das Negradas
- San Vicente de As Negradas
