= Bridge of Misericordia =

15th-century stone arch bridge in Viveiro, Galicia, Spain

Puente de la Misericordia Ponte da Misericordia
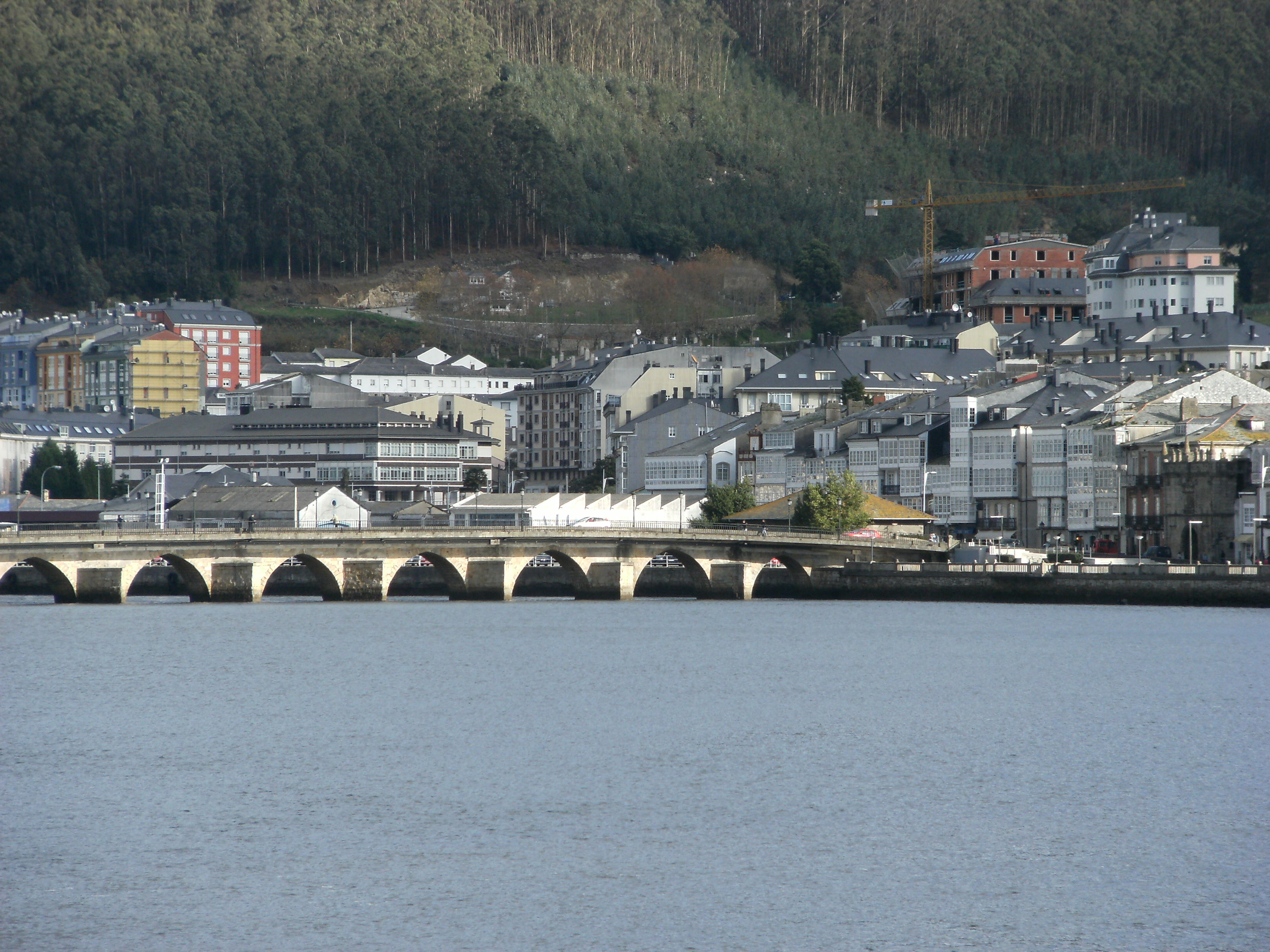
- The bridge seen from the ria de Viveiro
- Coordinates: 43°39′46″N 7°35′51″W
- Carries: Road LU-540 and pedestrians
- Crosses: Ria de Viveiro
- Locale: SpainViveiro, Lugo, Galicia, Spain

Characteristics
- Design: Arch bridge
- Material: Ashlar stone
- Total length: 500 m
- No. of spans: 9 (originally 12)

History
- Construction start: 1462
- Construction end: 1544

Location
- Interactive map of Puente de la Misericordia

The Puente de la Misericordia (also known as the Ponte da Misericordia or Puente Mayor) is a stone arch bridge located in the municipality of Viveiro, in the Province of Lugo, Galicia, Spain. The bridge connects the two banks of the Ria de Viveiro, running from the Puerta de Carlos V to the Capilla de la Misericordia, from which it takes its name. It is approximately 500 metres long and is protected under the Spanish Historical Heritage Law 16/1985.

== History ==
The site has a long history of bridge construction. Historical documents attest to the existence of a bridge here as early as 1224, and it is believed that the original structure may have been built during the Roman occupation of Galicia, which would also explain the origin of the town's name, derived from the Latin Vivarium.

Construction of the current bridge began in 1462 during the reign of Henry IV of Castile, as documented by the will of a local resident, Juan Veloso, who in January of that year bequeathed funds toward its construction:

"Item mando a obra da ponte de Viveiro des maravedís"

— Will of Juan Veloso

The bridge was completed in 1544 during the reign of Emperor Charles I of Spain and V of Germany. An academic study published in 2011 in Laboratorio de Arte identified two previously unpublished drawings of the bridge from 1702, one by architect Francisco de Castro Canseco, preserved in the National Historical Archive, which provide valuable documentation of its 18th-century appearance.

=== Modifications ===
The bridge underwent numerous transformations during the 19th and 20th centuries. In 1878 the road connecting the bridge to the Chapel of the Misericordia was widened. In 1890 the original parapets were demolished and metal cantilevers were installed, supported on the cutwaters. During the 1920s the cobbled roadway was reformed and new reinforced concrete cantilevers replaced the metal ones, which had deteriorated due to salt damage within 30 years. The cutwaters were also lowered and access to the bridge was improved by burying part of the structure. In 1949 the roadway was widened again and the pavements were reformed. The last major intervention took place between 1977 and 1982, after plans for a bypass viaduct were abandoned. A concrete slab with cantilevers on both sides was installed, completely altering the bridge's original profile.

The bridge originally had 12 arches, the first and last of semicircular form and the remaining ten ogival. Of these, only 9 are visible today: three arches were lost during construction works, one when the sea wall was built and two when the quay and new land reclamation works were carried out.

== Description ==
The bridge is built in ashlar stone and stretches approximately 500 metres across the Ria de Viveiro, making it one of the longest medieval bridges in Galicia. It currently carries road traffic in one direction (toward Playa de Covas) and pedestrians in both directions. At one end stands the Puerta de Carlos V, giving access to the historic town centre, and at the other end the baroque Chapel of the Misericordia, founded in 1603 by Rodrigo Alonso Alfeiran, which features a neoclassical altarpiece and frescoes painted in 1917 by Camilo Diaz Balino.

On one side of the bridge stands a granite cross known as the Cruz do Rollo. According to local legend, a knight who killed another nobleman in a dispute on the bridge ordered the cross to be erected on the spot so that passers-by might pray for the soul of the deceased. The knight was subsequently condemned at the gallows that reportedly stood in the area known as the Coto de la Misericordia.

== See also ==
- Viveiro
