= San Miguel das Negradas =

Locality in Spain

Coordinates: 43°42′48″N 7°40′42″W

San Miguel das Negradas (O Vicedo) is one of the parishes of the municipality of O Vicedo in Galicia, Spain.

San Miguel das Negradas is on the north-west coast of the province of Lugo, on the border with the municipality of Mañón in the province of A Coruña. The parish includes the island of San Martiño.

In 1991 it had a population of 339 inhabitants distributed in the lugares of:

- San Roque (previously called Santa Mariña), with a chapel of the same name. Includes, apart from San Roque, Crecide, A Gateriza, A Poceira, A Barreira, and A Gándara
- O Mosteiro — where a monastery existed during the Middle Ages. Includes also: Chelo, Noche, Salgueiros, A Redonda, As Alpuxarras
- O Outro Lado (O Morgallón, Creximil, A Aspra, O Montedinsua)
- O Xurbal, O Muronovo, O Abelaedo.
