= A Mariña Occidental =

Coordinates: 43.6333°N 7.6°W

- Comarca
- Flag Coat of arms
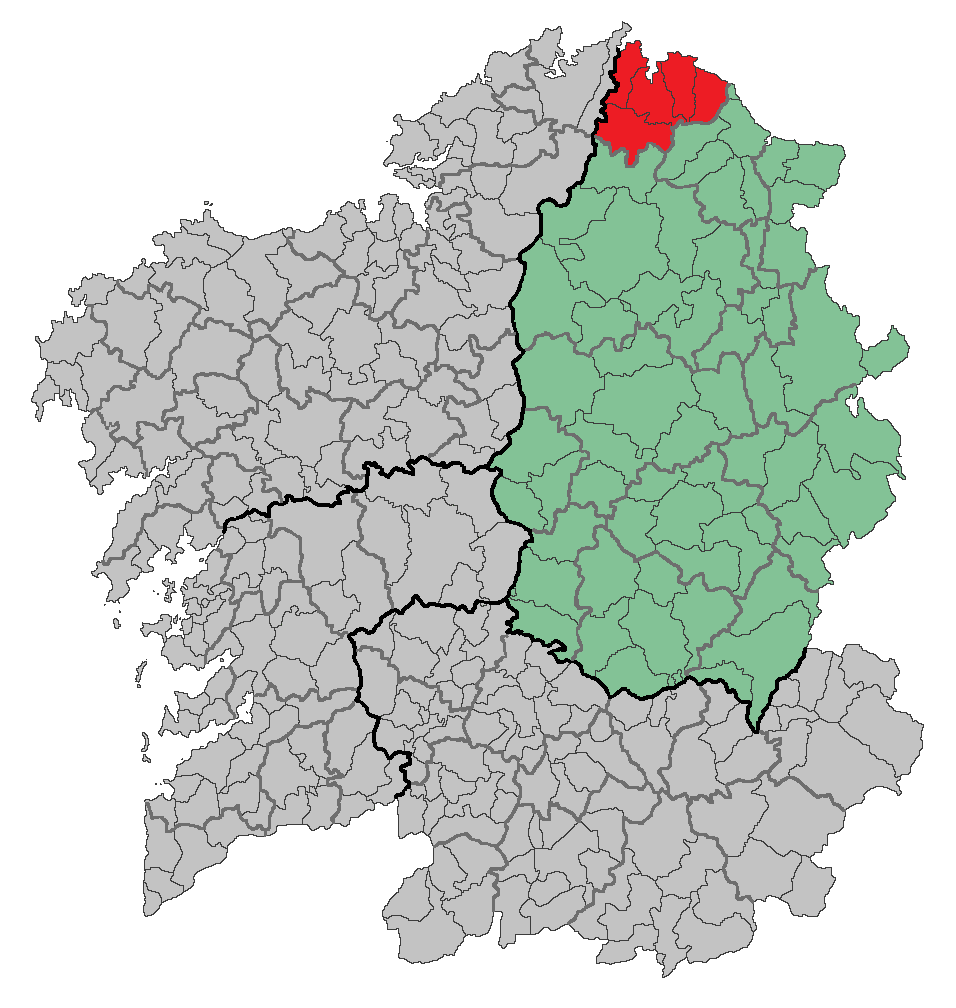
- Country: Spain
- Autonomous community: Galicia
- Province: Lugo
- Capital: Viveiro
- Municipalities: List: Cervo, Ourol, O Vicedo, Viveiro, Xove
- Time zone: UTC+1 (CET)
  - Summer (DST): UTC+2 (CEST)

A Mariña Occidental is a comarca in the Galician Province of Lugo. The overall population of this local region is 25,659 (2019).

== Municipalities ==
Cervo, Ourol, O Vicedo, Viveiro and Xove.
