= Río Barba =

Parish of O Vicedo, Galicia, Spain

Coordinates: 43°40′15″N 7°40′6″W

San Paulo de Río Barba is a parish of the municipality of O Vicedo, Galicia, Spain.

It is composed of the following places:

- Abezan
- A Cova
- A Forqueta
- A Insua
- A Pardiñeira
- A Sanga
- As Mangas
- Cortellas
- Espido
- Espigueiras
- Golpeiras
- Maladas
- O Canto de Muro
- O Chao
- O Monte dos Bois
- O Porto
- O Regal
- O Rego
- O Rego dos Bois
- O Tellado
- O Vilar
- Os Sirgos
- Os Navallos
