= Xove =

Coordinates: 43°41′09″N 07°30′32″W

Concello de Xove
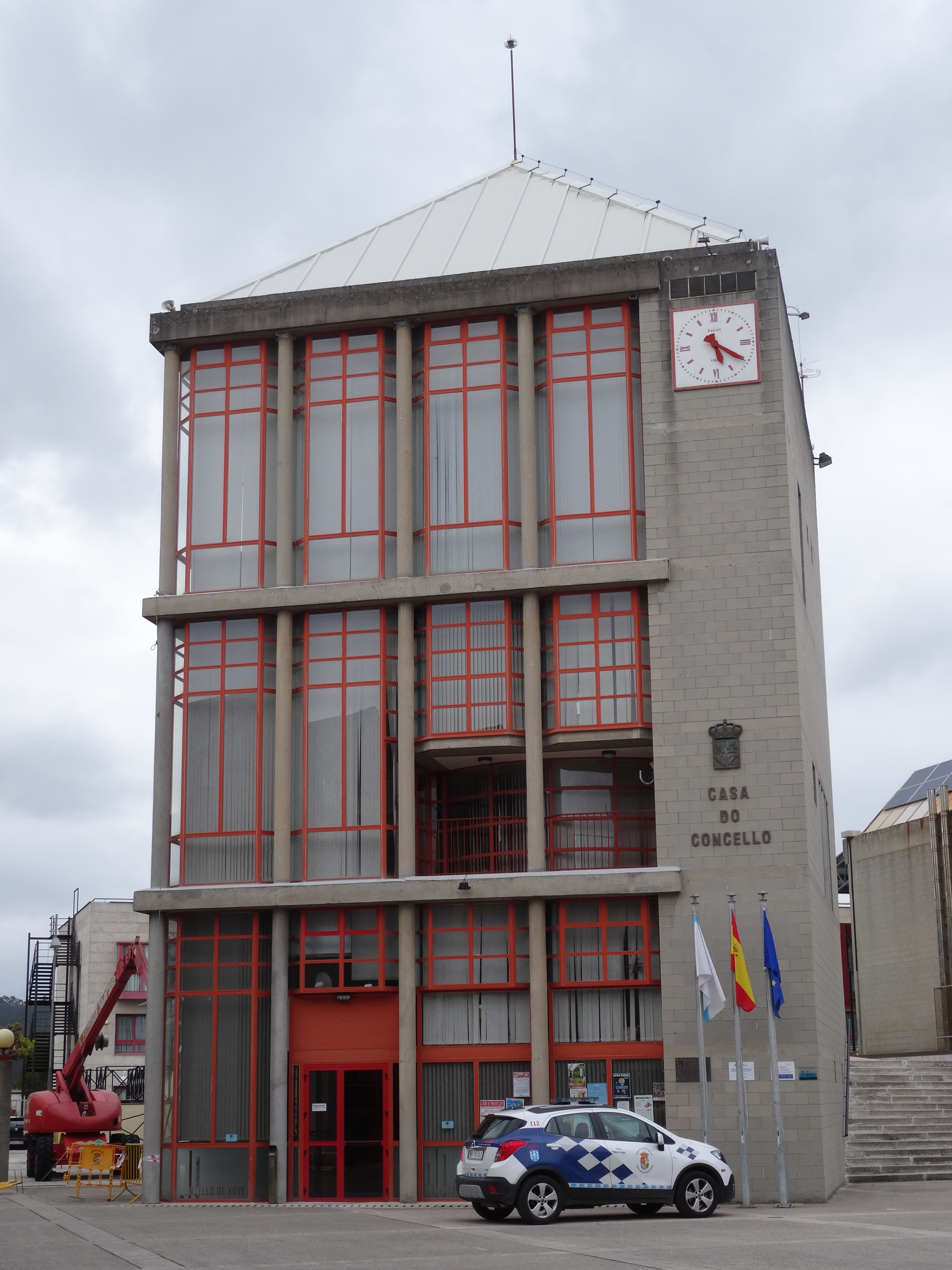

- Coat of arms

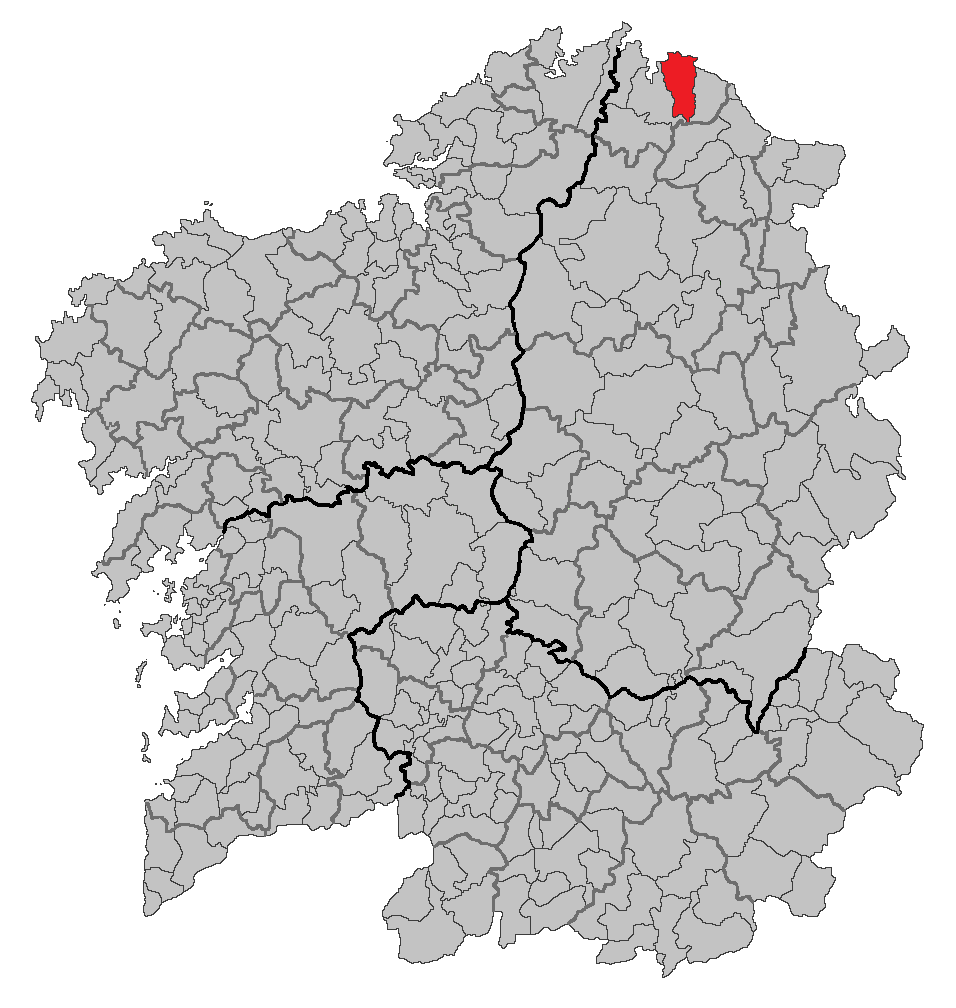
- Situation of Xove within Galicia
- Country: Spain

Government
  - Alcalde (Mayor): Demetrio Salgueiro Rapa (PP)

Area
  - Total: 89.1 km^{2} (34.4 sq mi)

Population (2007)
  - Total: 3,602
- Time zone: UTC+1 (CET)
  - Summer (DST): UTC+2 (CET)

Xove is a municipality in the province of Lugo, in the autonomous community of Galicia, Spain. It belongs to the comarca of A Mariña Occidental.

== Geography ==
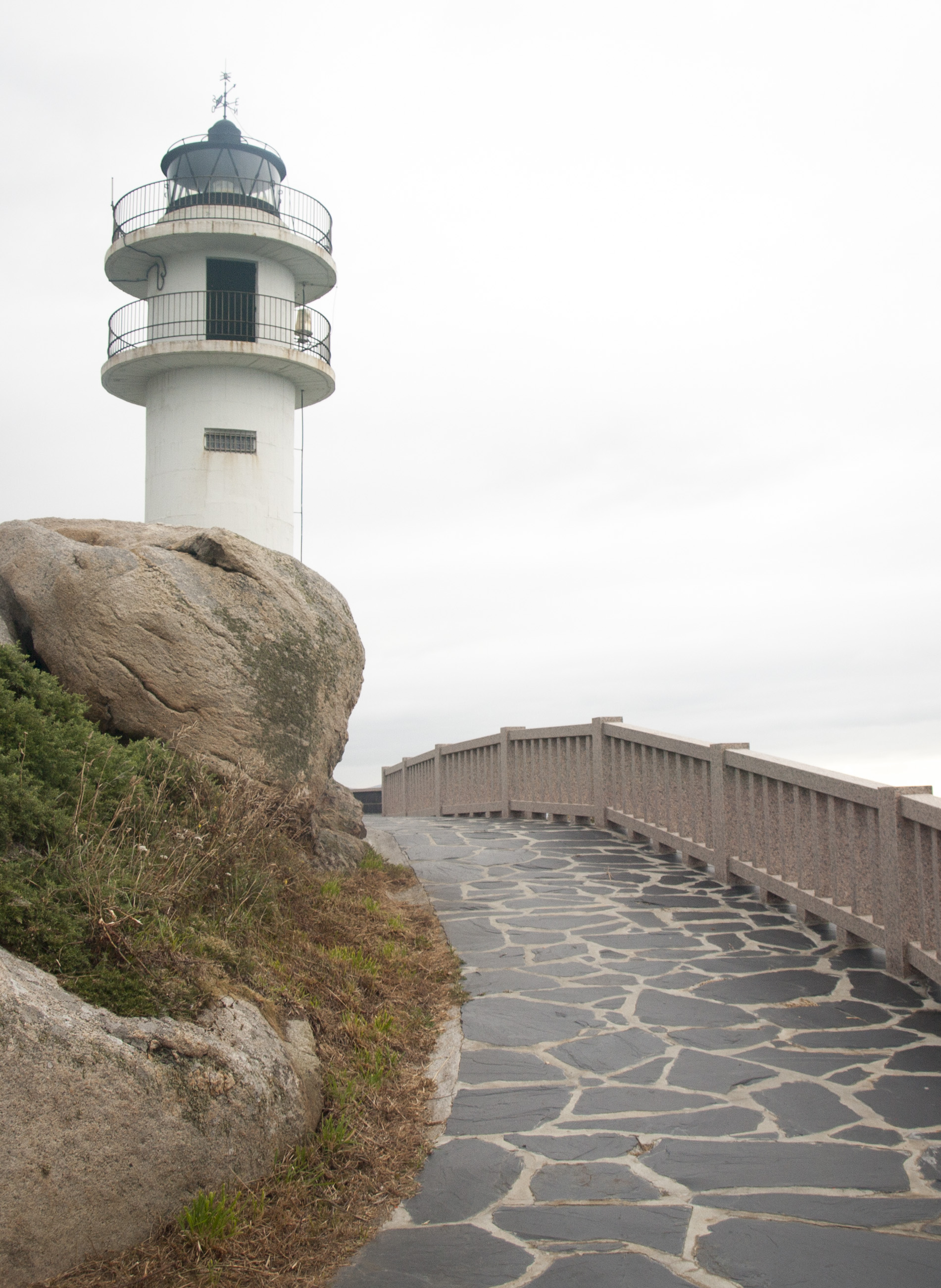
Punta Roncadoira Lighthouse

Punta Roncadoira (Roncadoira Point) is the location of the Punta Roncadoira Lighthouse on the Atlantic coast within the Cove municipality.
