= Ourol =

Coordinates: 42°52′N 7°37′W

- Municipality
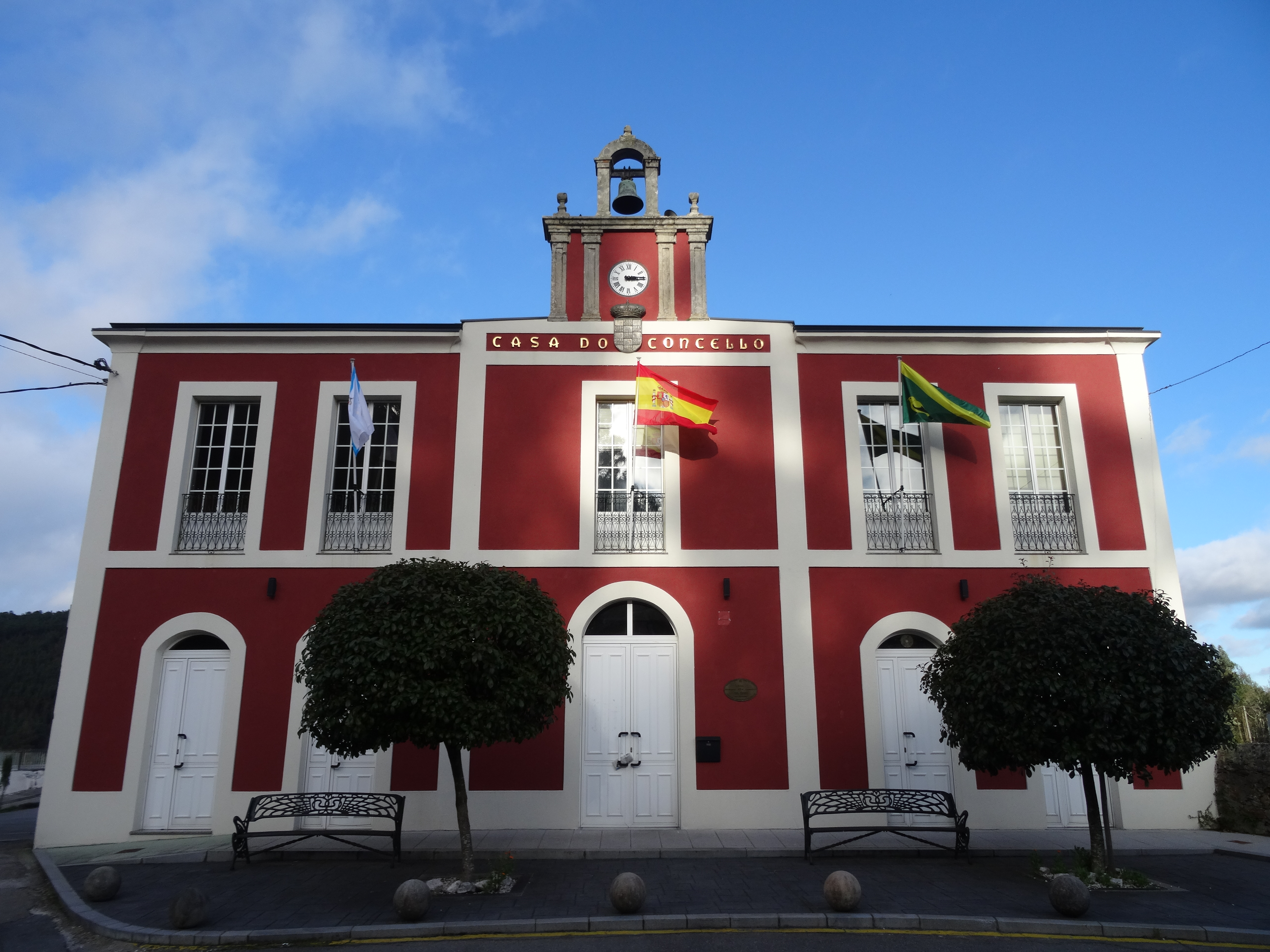
- Town hall.

- Flag Coat of arms

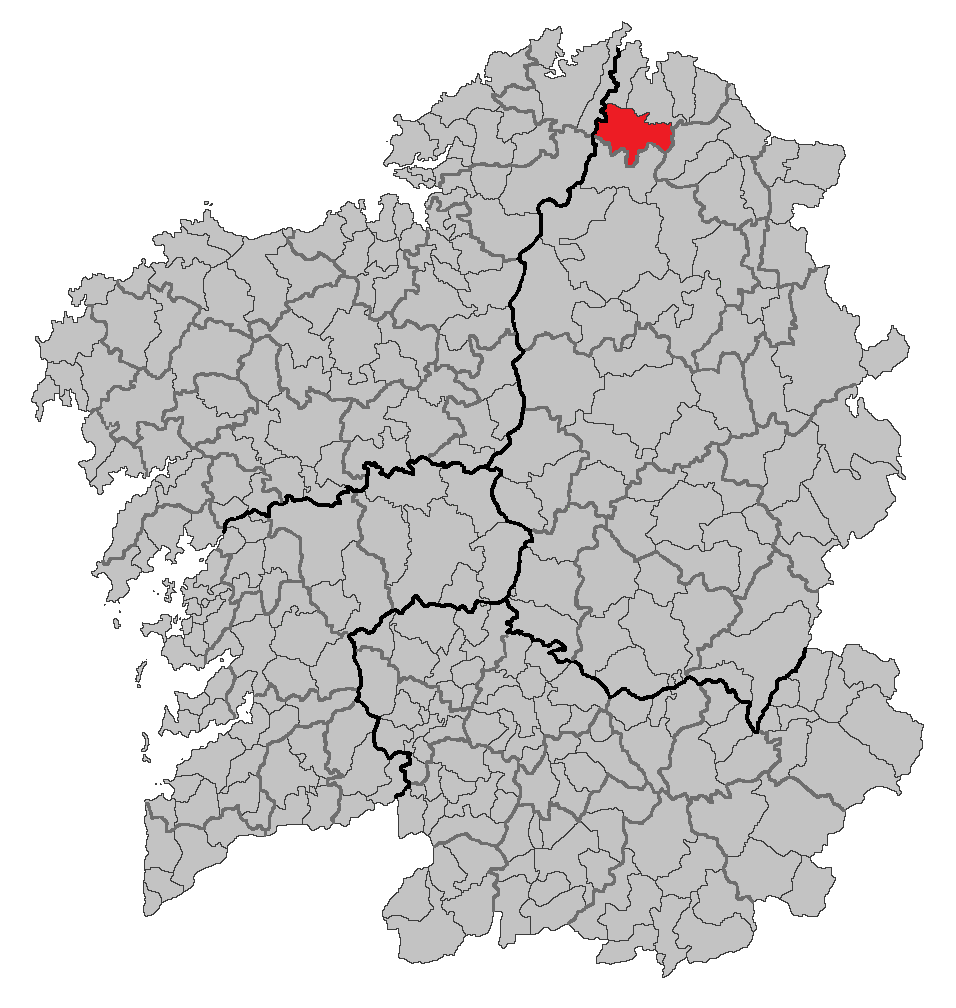
- Location of Ourol

- Location in Spain
- Country: Spain
- Autonomous community: Galicia
- Province: Lugo
- Comarca: A Mariña Occidental

Government
  - Alcalde: José Luis Pajón Camba (PSdeG-PSOE)
- Demonym: Ourolense
- Time zone: UTC+1 (CET)
  - Summer (DST): UTC+2 (CEST)
- Postal code: 27865
- Website: Official website

Ourol is a municipality in the province of Lugo, in the autonomous community of Galicia, Spain. It belongs to the comarca of A Mariña Occidental.

According to INE, the population in 2009 was 1,157 inhabitants.

== Location ==
With a total area of 145.4 km^{2}, Ourol is divided into eight parishes:

- Ambosores (Santa María)
- Bravos (Santiago)
- Merille (Santa Eulalia)
- Miñotos (San Pedro)
- Ourol (Santa María)
- San Pantaleón de Cabanas (San Pantaleón)
- O Sisto (Santa María)
- Xerdiz (Santa María)

The municipality is bordered by the municipalities of Viveiro and Vicedo to the north, to south by Muras, to the east by Valadouro and to the west by Mañón.

== Demography ==
From:{INE Archiv

== History ==
=== Paleolithic period ===
Due to the wealth of remains of later periods such as the Megalithic period or constructed forts, the Paleolithic era has been studied little. However, in 1922, Obermaier, who visited Galicia to collect data for his lectures on prehistory, predicted there was no doubt that the Paleolithic man lived in Galicia during the glacial and interglacial periods. In 1925, the first discoveries of stone industries began. There are many findings in the area of La Guardia and Baiona or Lower Minho. Between the 1960s and 1980s excavations were carried out in the provinces of Lugo, Ourense and Pontevedra leading to discoveries of extended Paleolithic and Mesolithic deposits throughout the region. In Ourol the Mesolithic site of Xestido in Miñotos was highlighted as well. Deposits of microlithic industry laminar and microlith geometry were also discovered.

=== Megalithic culture ===
The megalithic culture is characterized by the construction of memorials. In Ourol, the following mounds are recorded:

- A Veiga in San Pantaleon de Cabanas: hemispherical mound, overgrown, has a large cone of spoliation. There are remnants of a vault or other structures such as perimeter ring. Its dimensions are approximately 12 meters in diameter and 1.30 meters high.
- Penido Vello/Huchas de Penido Vello: mound dimensions of about 16 meters, has a maximum height of 130 cm. Presents a megalithic chamber that converses the cover.
- Mound 1 de Pena do Toxo
- Mound 2 de Pena do Toxo
- Mounds de Monte Cristo dos Callós: necropolis formed by seven mounds.
