= Ortigueira =

- Municipality
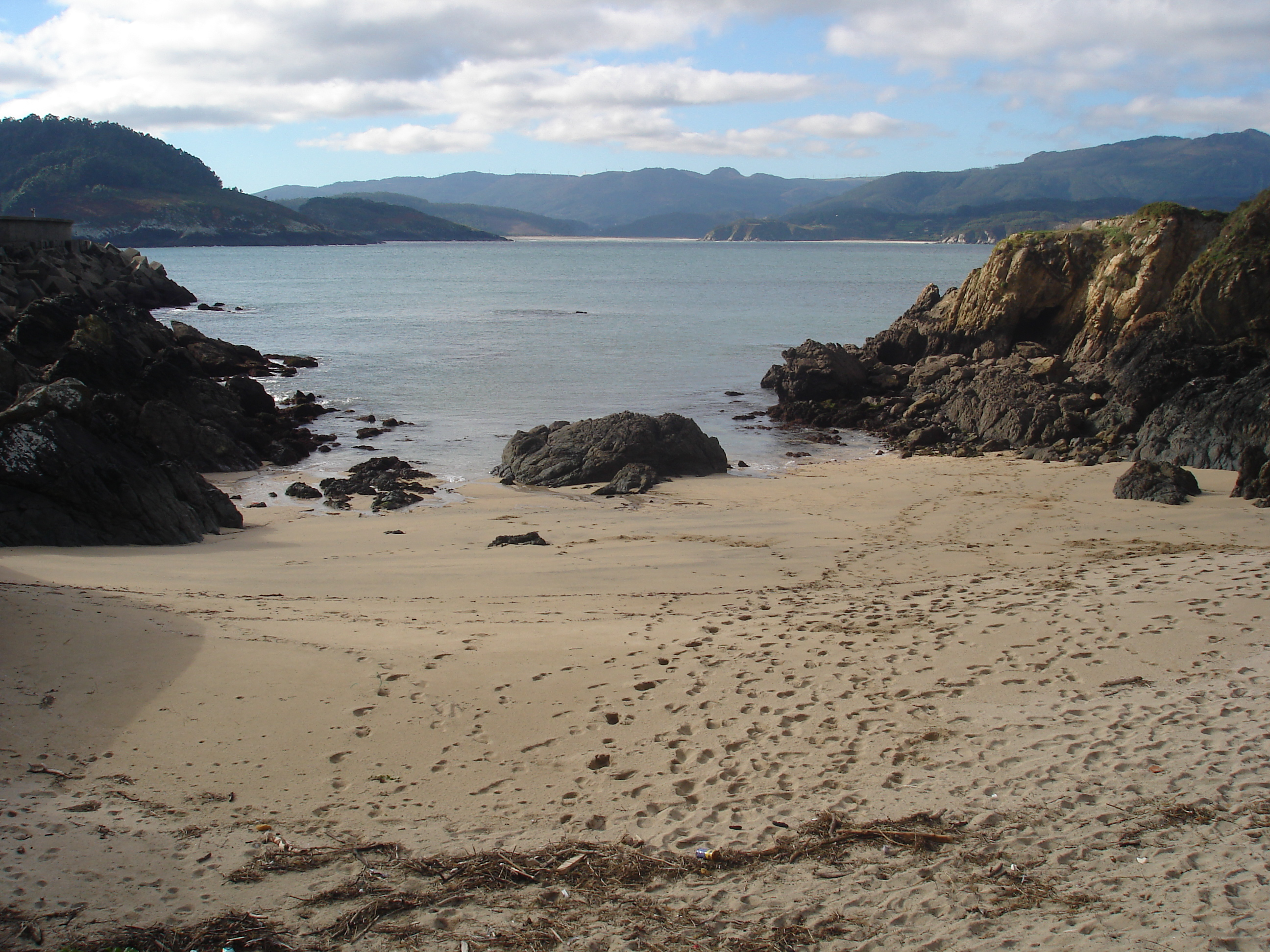
- Orbeiro Beach.

- Flag Coat of arms

- Location in Spain. Ortigueira (Galicia) Ortigueira (Spain)
- Coordinates: 43°40′59″N 7°51′00″W
- Country: Spain
- Autonomous Community: Galicia
- Province: A Coruña
- Comarca: Ortegal

Government
  - Mayor: Juan Penabad Muras

Area
  - Total: 209.60 km^{2} (80.93 sq mi)

Population (2025-01-01)
  - Total: 5,384
  - Density: 25.69/km^{2} (66.53/sq mi)
- Demonym: Orteganos
- Time zone: UTC+1 (CET)
  - Summer (DST): UTC+2 (CEST)
- Website: Official website

Ortigueira is a seaport and municipality in the province of A Coruña the autonomous community of Galicia in northwestern Spain. It belongs to the comarca of Ortegal. It is located on the northern slope of the Serra da Faladoira, the river Mera and on the eastern shore of the Ria de Santa Marta—a winding, rock-bound and much indented inlet of the Bay of Biscay, between Capes Ortegal and Bares, the northernmost headlands of the Peninsula. The town is noted for its romantic surroundings and sea bathing opportunities.

== Port of Espasante (Ortigueira) ==
The industries are fishing and farming. The harbour is well sheltered. Owing to its shallowness, large vessels cannot enter, but there is an important coasting trade, despite the dangerous character of the coast and the prevalence of fogs and gales.

== Culture ==
Ortigueira is notable for hosting Ortigueira's Festival of Celtic World, a folk music festival dedicated to the Celtic nations.

== See also ==
List of municipalities in A Coruña
