= O Vicedo =

- Municipality
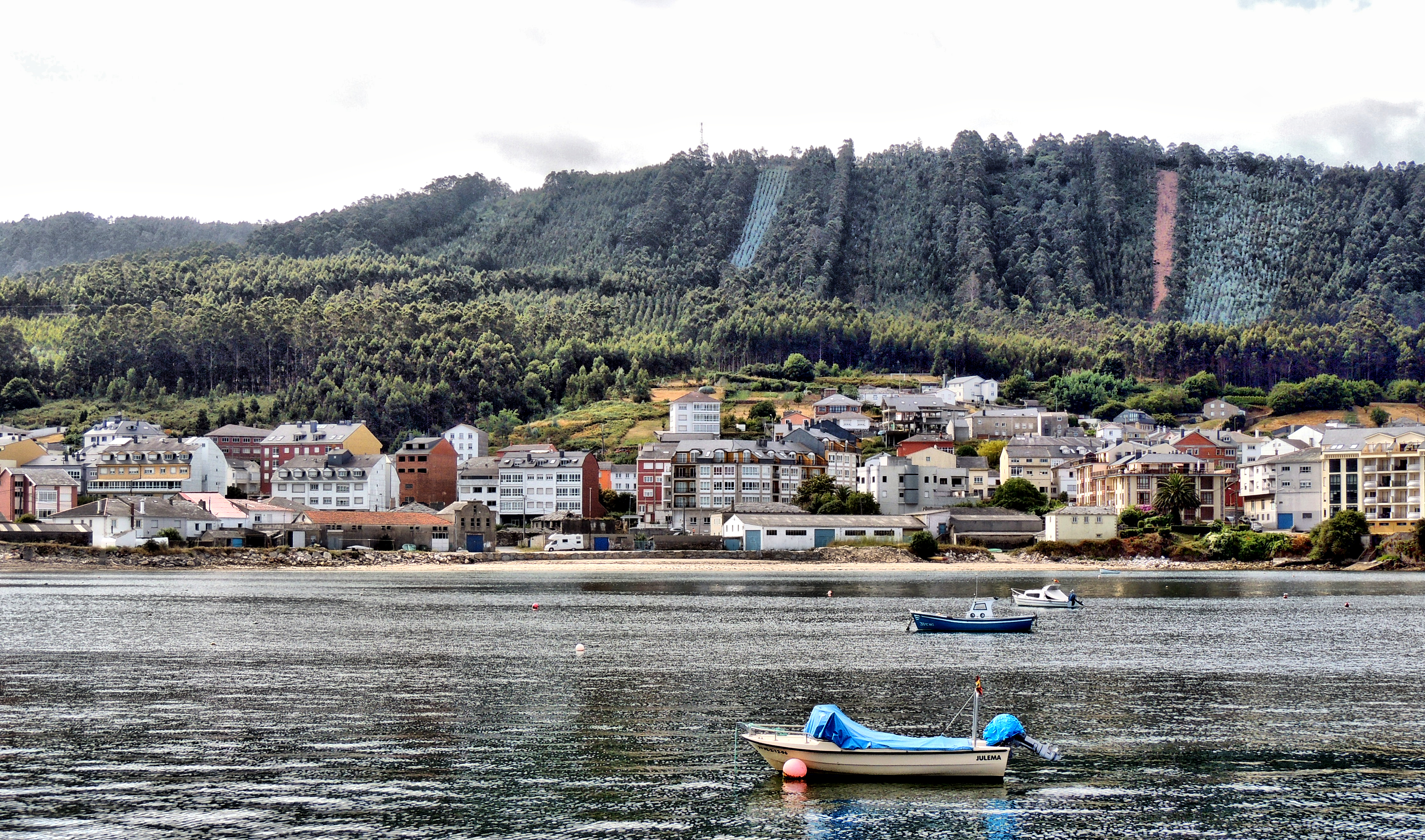

- Coat of arms

- Location within Spain
- Coordinates: 43°44′0″N 7°40′19″W
- Country: Spain
- Community: Galicia
- Province: Lugo
- Comarca: A Mariña Occidental

Government
  - Mayor: José Jesús Novo Martínez

Area
  - Total: 75.96 km^{2} (29.33 sq mi)
- Elevation: 20 m (66 ft)

Population (2025-01-01)
  - Total: 1,553
  - Density: 20.44/km^{2} (52.95/sq mi)
- Demonym: Vicedenses
- Time zone: UTC+1 (CET)
  - Summer (DST): UTC+2 (CEST)
- Website: Official website

O Vicedo is a municipality located on the extreme northern coast of Galicia, Spain, in the province of Lugo. It belongs to the comarca of A Mariña Occidental.

== Etymology ==
O Vicedo seems to have its base in the Latin word "vitiates". Therefore, it can be translated as "the place where the 'vice' abounds". 'Vice' is an annual legume of the Papilionaceae subfamily that abounds in coastal zones all throughout Europe.

== Geography and environment ==
=== Location ===
The municipality of O Vicedo is located in the northwest of the Iberian Peninsula. It is located in the comarca of A Mariña Occidental, north of the Autonomous Community of Galicia. It is bordered on the north by the Cantabrian Sea, to the south by the municipality of Ourol, to the east by Viveiro and to the west by Mañón. Its district covers an area of 75.96 km^{2}.

=== Orography ===
The landscape of the O Vicedo municipality is characterized as generally hilly with strong contrasts. The municipality is crossed by two mountain cores that run from south to north. The mountain range of Couteiro, which begin in the municipality with Ourol in the civil parish of Cabanas, reaches its highest point on Mount Padro, close to Vivero border. The other main formation is that of Riobarba with a low altitude. This formation forms a series of mountains.

=== Coast ===
On the coast of the municipality of O Videdo there are a total of eight beaches. They have different dimensions and occupations according to their characteristics and the environment where they are located.

== Parishes ==
It is composed of the following "parroquias" or "freguesias" (parishes):

As Negradas, Cabanas, Mosende, San Román do Vale, Santo Estevo do Vale (O Vicedo), Riobarba, Suegos.

In the Middle Age the parishes that now compose all the municipality of O Vicedo belonged to different Lords, and were under their jurisdiction (As Negradas, Galdo, Viveiro, etc.).

With the Constitution of 1812 the first municipalities were created. The territory that now occupies the municipality of O Vicedo was divided into 3 municipalities: As Negradas, Val, and Cabanas.

A new municipal division was defined in 1835 when the present territory of the municipality was distributed to the following councils: Galdo (O Vicedo, Negradas and Vale) and Viveiro (Suegos, Mosende, Riobarba and Cabanas). This division lasted only 5 years and in 1840 the municipality of Riobarba appeared, reflected in the Government report on the Province of Lugo which defined the present parishes. In 1952 the Civil Governor of Lugo moved the municipality capital to O Vicedo.

== Government ==
O Vicedo achieved some national notoriety within Spain during the 1990s when a corruption scandal developed, involving the then mayor Isaac Prado Villapol and other councilors from the Partido Popular (PP).
