= Ortegal =

Coordinates: 43°41′35″N 7°50′39″W

- Comarca
- Flag Coat of arms
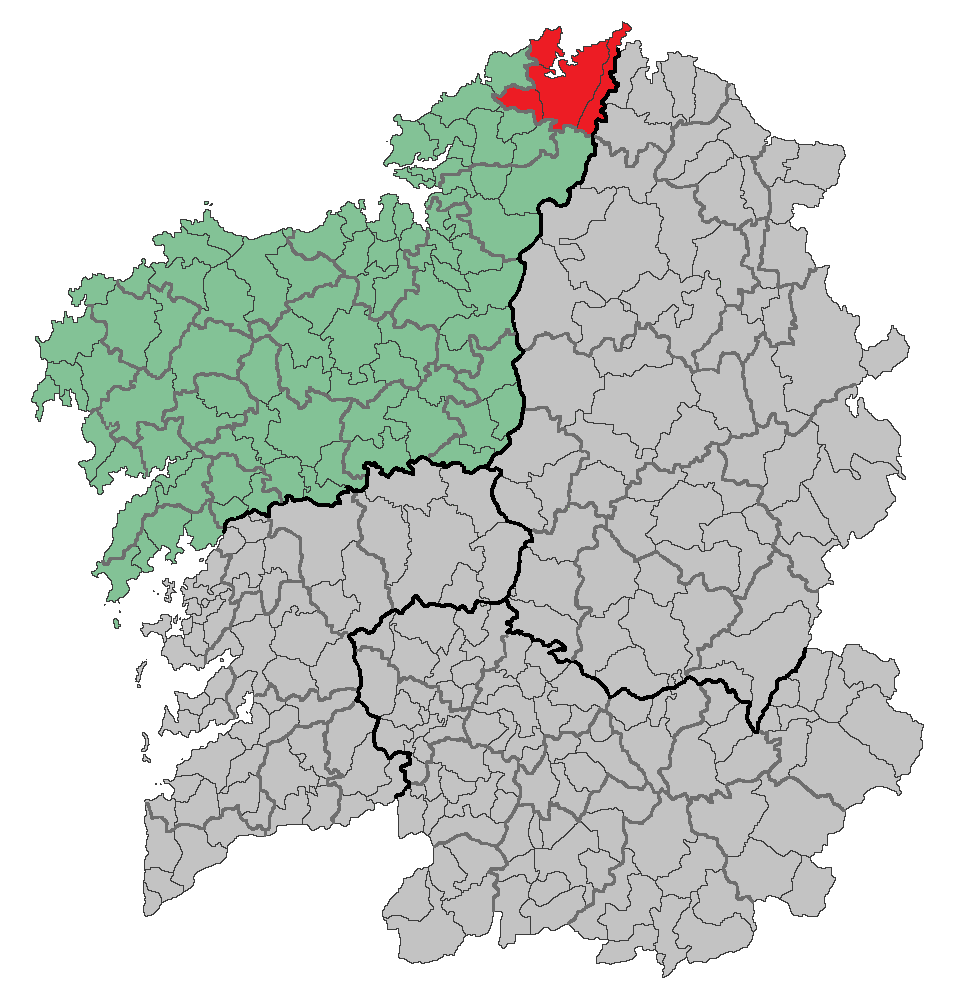
- Country: Spain
- Autonomous community: Galicia
- Province: A Coruña
- Capital: Ortigueira
- Municipalities: List: Cariño, Cerdido, Mañón, Ortigueira

Area
  - Total: 394.3 km^{2} (152.2 sq mi)

Population (2022)
  - Total: 11,466
  - Density: 29.08/km^{2} (75.32/sq mi)
- Demonym: Orteguense
- Time zone: UTC+1 (CET)
  - Summer (DST): UTC+2 (CEST)

Ortegal is a comarca in the north of the Galician Province of A Coruña, Spain. It borders the Atlantic Ocean and the Cantabrian Sea to the north, the Province of Lugo to the east, the comarca of O Eume to the south, and the comarca of Ferrol to the west. It covers an area of 394.3 km^{2}, which accounts for 1.33% of all the land area in Galicia. The overall population of this region was 13,916 at the 2011 census; the latest official 2022 census was 11,466.

== Municipalities ==
The comarca comprises the following four municipalities:

Name of municipality	Population (2001)	Population (2011)	Population (2022)
Cariño	4,844	4,374	3,699
Cerdido	1,568	1,304	1,060
Mañón	1,870	1,541	1,287
Ortigueira	8,172	6,697	5,420
Totals	16,454	13,916	11,466

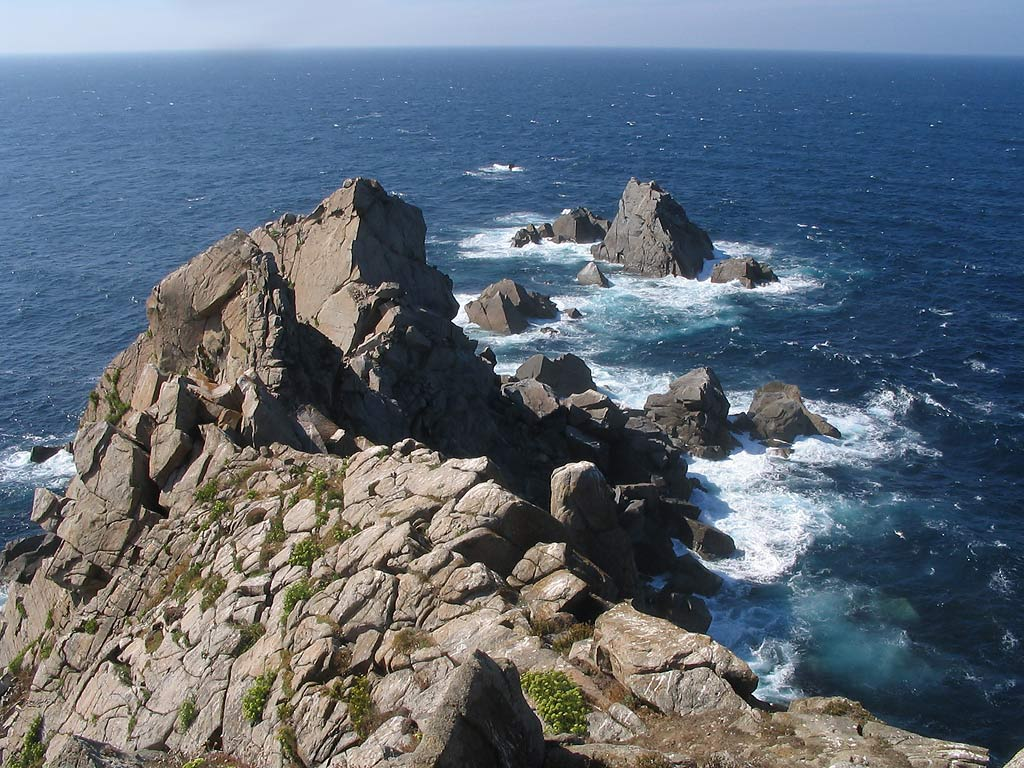
Punta de Estaca de Bares, the northernmost point of the Iberian Peninsula, is located in the Mañón municipality of Ortegal.

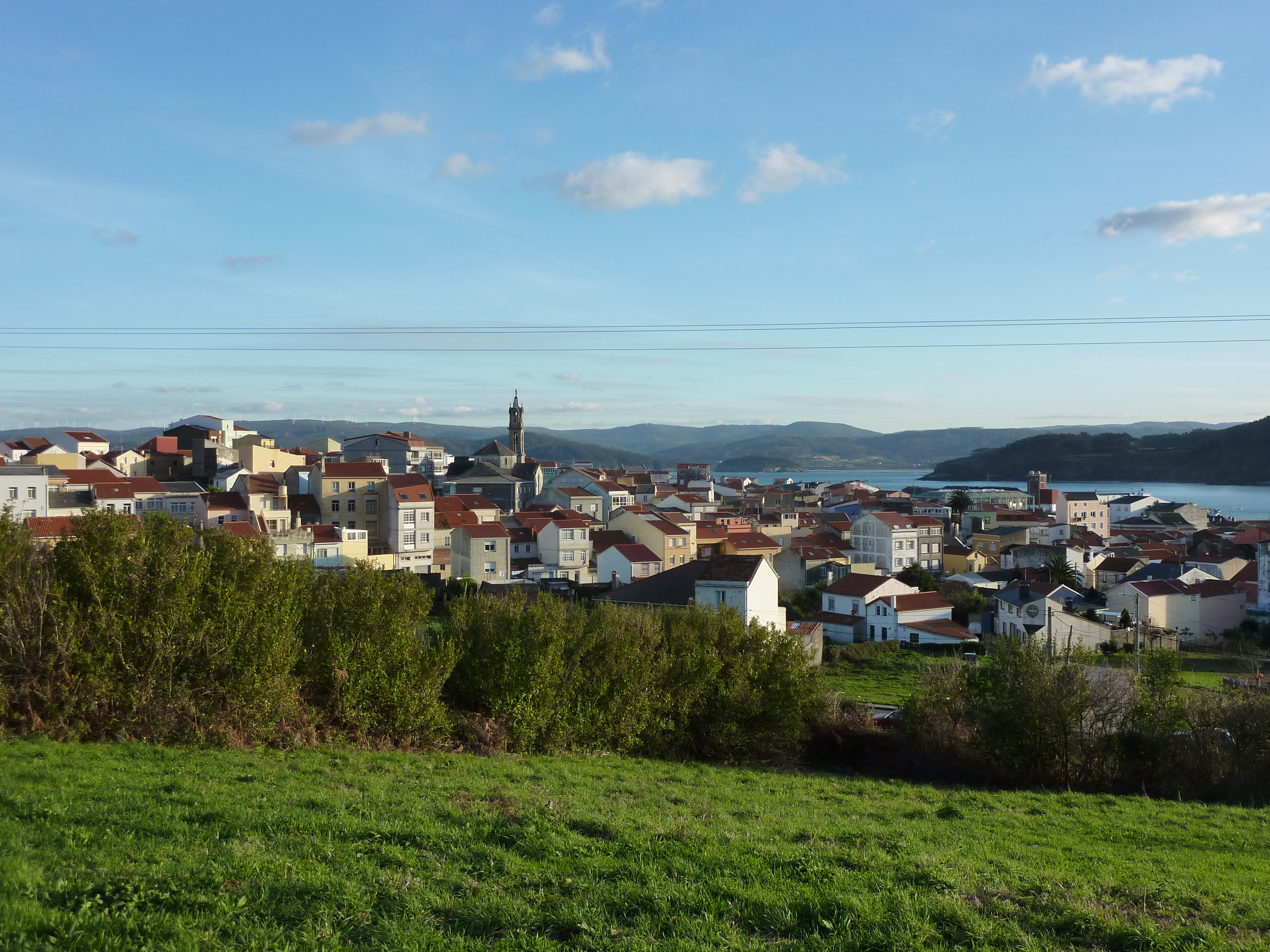
Cariño

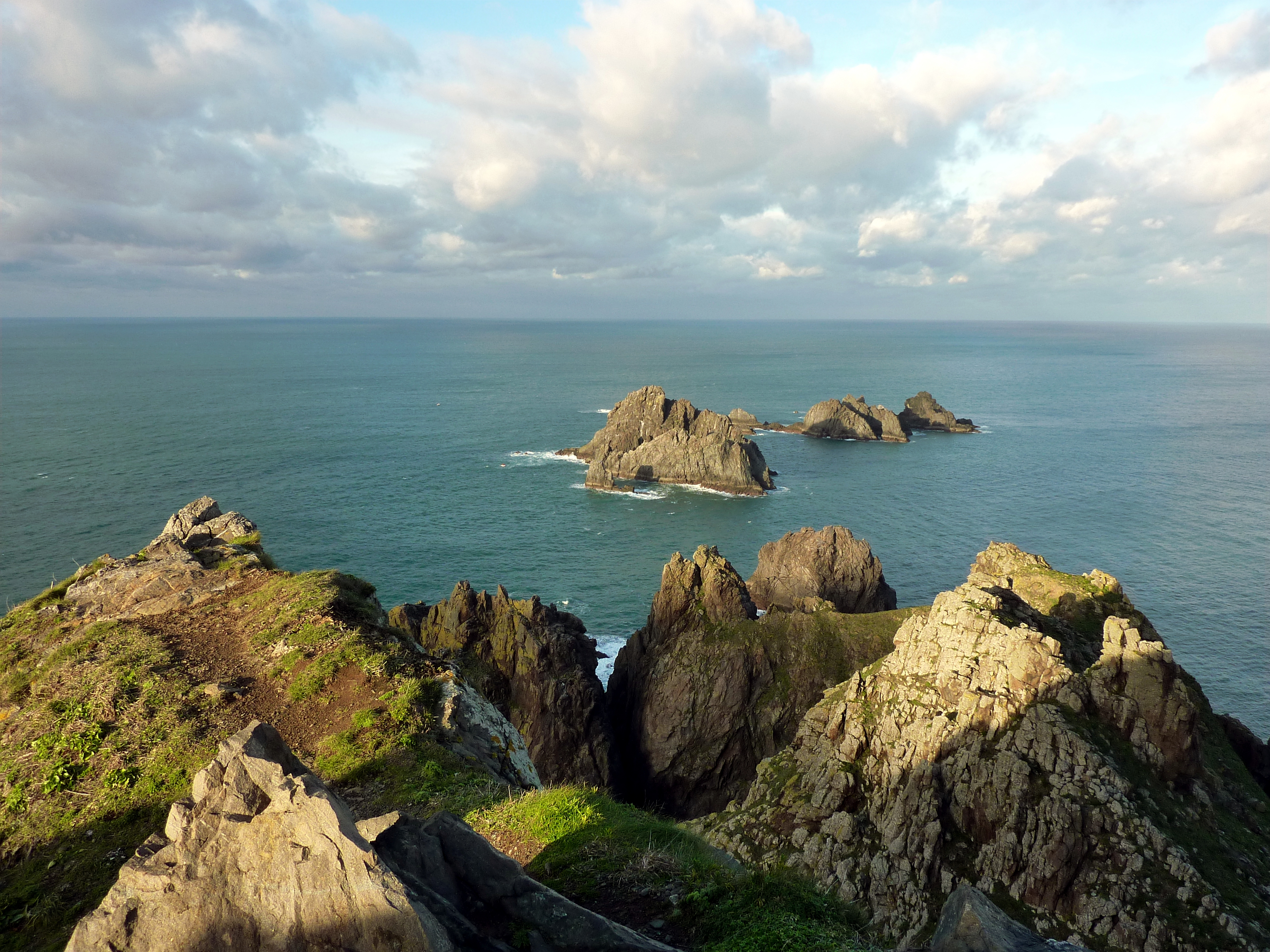
Cabo Ortegal
