= Centro Galego de Arte Contemporánea =

Galician Contemporary Art Centre
- Centro Galego de Arte Contemporánea
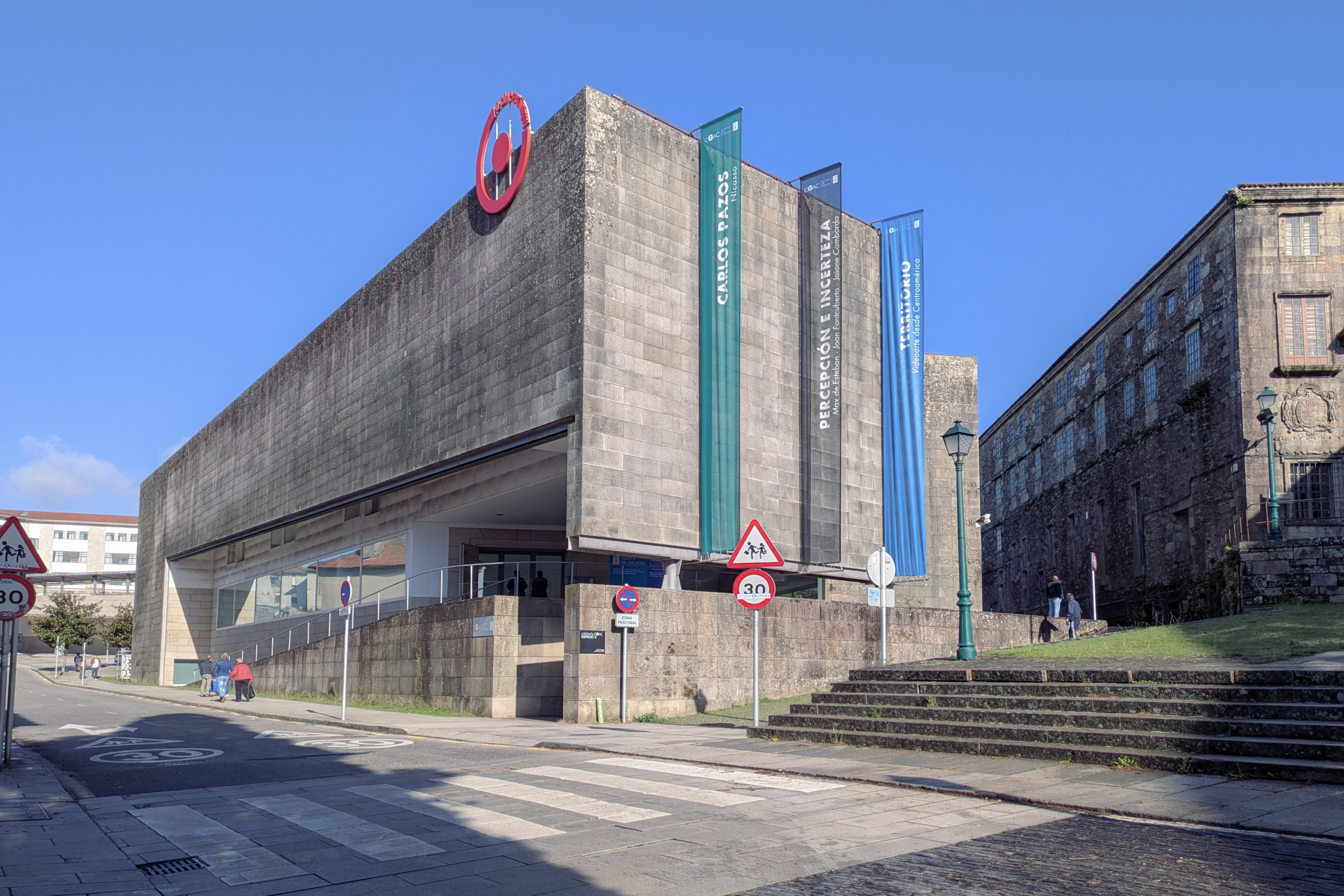
- Established: 1993
- Location: Rúa Valle Inclán, s/n Santiago de Compostela, Galicia, Spain
- Coordinates: 42.882662°N 8.53944°W
- Type: Contemporary art museum
- Visitors: 59,030 (2019)
- Director: Santiago Olmo García
- Architect: Álvaro Siza Vieira
- Website: www.cgac.org

The Centro Galego de Arte Contemporánea (English, Galician Contemporary Art Centre), CGAC is an arts centre based in Santiago de Compostela that aims to promote culture in Galicia through exhibition, enjoyment and knowledge of the trends and currents of contemporary artistic creation.

== The institution ==
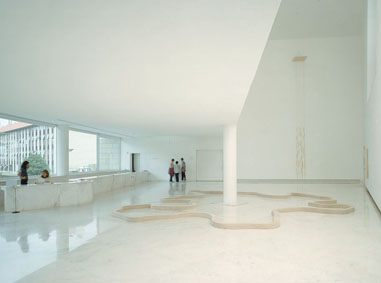
Jürgen Partenheimer, Centro Galego de Arte Contemporánea, CGAC, Santiago de Compostela, 1999.

The CGAC was created under the jurisdiction of Article 27.19 of the Statute of Autonomy of Galicia and through Decrees 308/1989 and 326/1996. It was established in 1993, with an anthological exhibition by Maruja Mallo, and has had a stable program since the end of 1994, starting with Itínere. Camiño e camiñantes exhibition.

Its contemporary art collection is made up of the collections of the Xunta de Galicia, the collections acquired by the centre itself, and those from deposits or donations. It has to be highlighted the inclusion of works by Galician artists in continuous dialogue with the artistic creation of the rest of the Spanish state and the international arena.

The direction of the Galician Contemporary Art Centre has been carried out since its foundation by the following people:

- Antón Pulido Novoa from 1993 to 1994
- Gloria Moure Cao from 1994 to 1998
- Miguel Fernández-Cid Enríquez from 1998 to 2005
- Manuel Olveira Paz from November 2005 to June 2009
- Miguel Von Hafe Pérez from November 2009 to December 2014
- Santiago B. Olmo García from July 2015

== The building ==
CGAC is located on the edge of Santiago de Compostela, in a space that shares neighborhood with the Convento de San Domingos de Bonaval, which houses the Panteón de Galegos Ilustres (trans., Pantheon of Illustrious Galicians) and the Museo do Pobo Galego (trans., Museum of the Galician People). Also the recovery of the San Domingos Park in the space adjacent to the CGAC, respects the distribution of the old convent garden, with the succession of terraces, a Galician solution to the use of the land's unevenness for agricultural use.

It was designed by the Portuguese architect Álvaro Siza Vieira (Matosinhos, 1933). This is the only city outside Portugal that has two works by this architect, the other being the Faculty of Journalism, at the University of Santiago de Compostela. The building began to take shape in 1988, the project being presented in 1992 and construction being completed between 1993 and 1994. The structure has three floors that include an entrance porch, auditorium, coffee shop, library, administrative offices and exhibition halls. The terrace is accessible and provides a view of the roofs of the old quarter of the city and the Convent of San Domingos de Bonaval.

== The collection ==
Since its foundation in the mid-1990s, the museum has been acquiring works of artists focusing on the second half of the 20th century to the present day, until completing a collection of around 1,300 pieces by international and Galician artists.

== See also ==
=== External links ===
- Website of Centro Galego de Arte Contemporánea — CGAC
- Interview with the former director of CGAC, Manuel Olveira
- Museos Consumer.es
