= Cervo, Lugo =

Municipality in Lugo, Spain

Coordinates: 43°40′55″N 7°26′52″W

Cervo
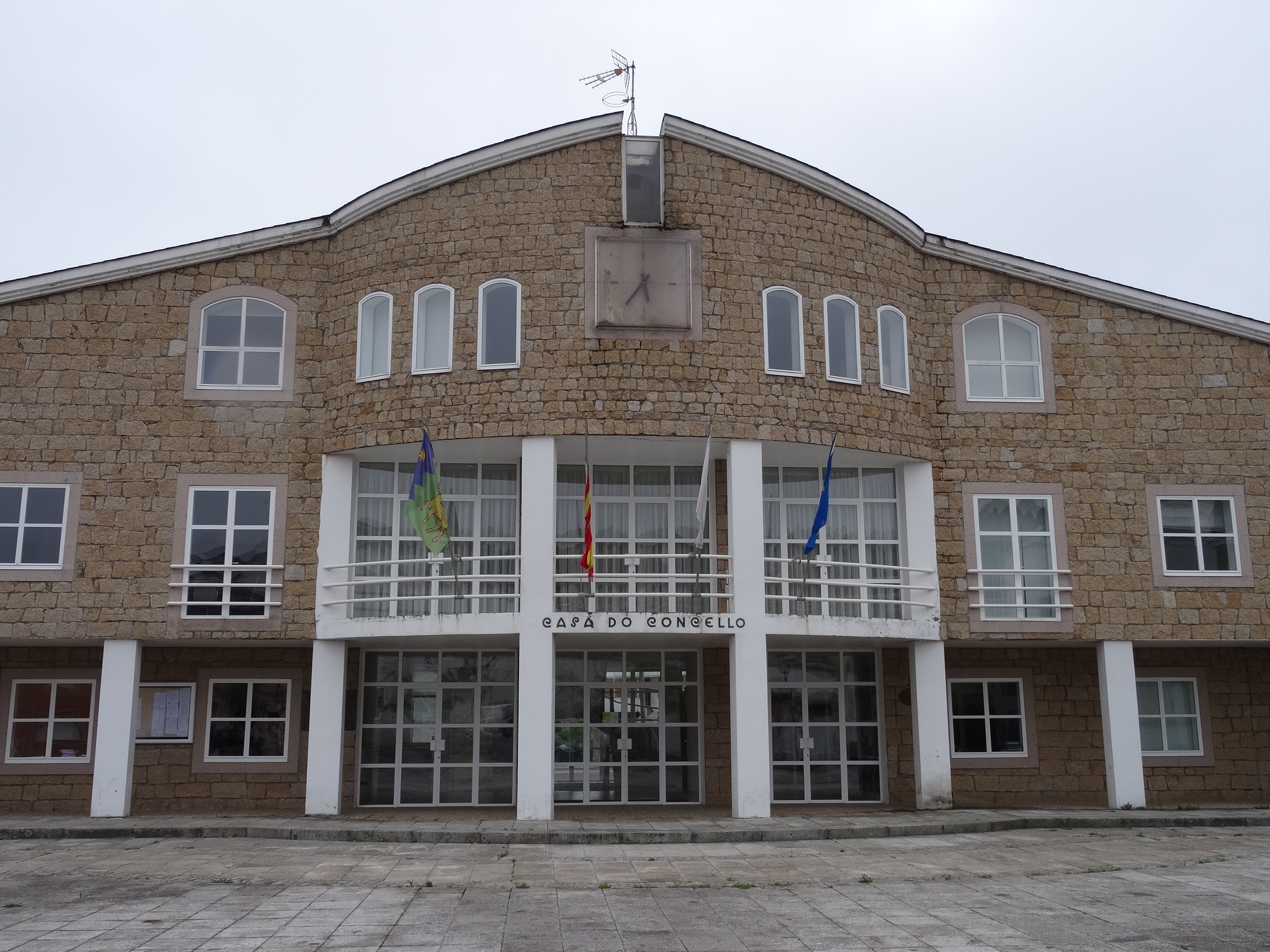
- Town hall.

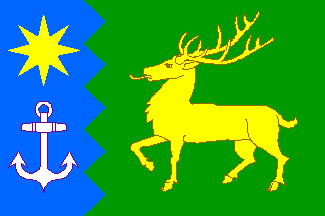
- Flag Coat of arms

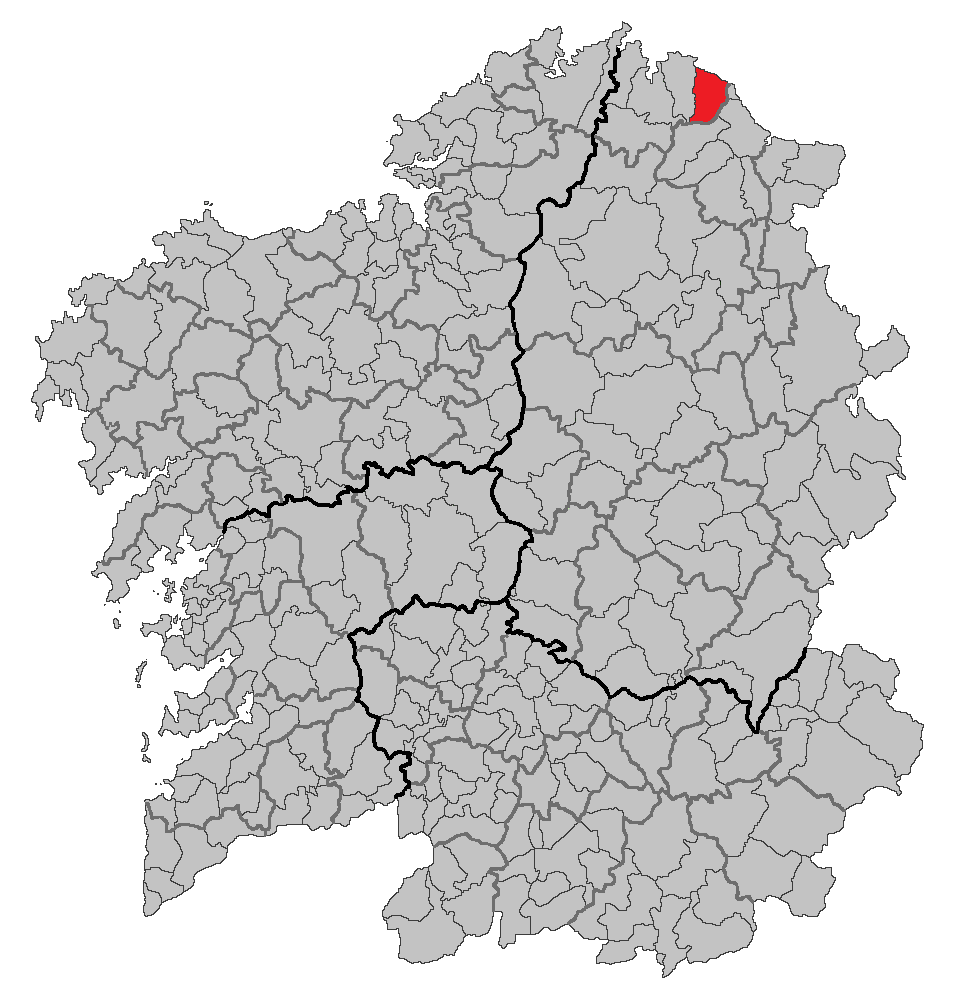
- Situation of Cervo within Galicia
- Country: Spain
- Autonomous community: Galicia
- Province: Lugo
- Comarca: A Mariña Occidental

Government
  - Alcalde (Mayor): Alfonso Villares Bermúdez (PP)

Population (2025-01-01)
  - Total: 4,137
- Time zone: UTC+1 (CET)
  - Summer (DST): UTC+2 (CET)
- Website: Official Website

Cervo is a municipality in the province of Lugo, in the autonomous community of Galicia, Spain. It belongs to the comarca of A Mariña Occidental.

== Etymology ==
In the Galician language, cervo means deer.
