= Viveiro =

- Municipality
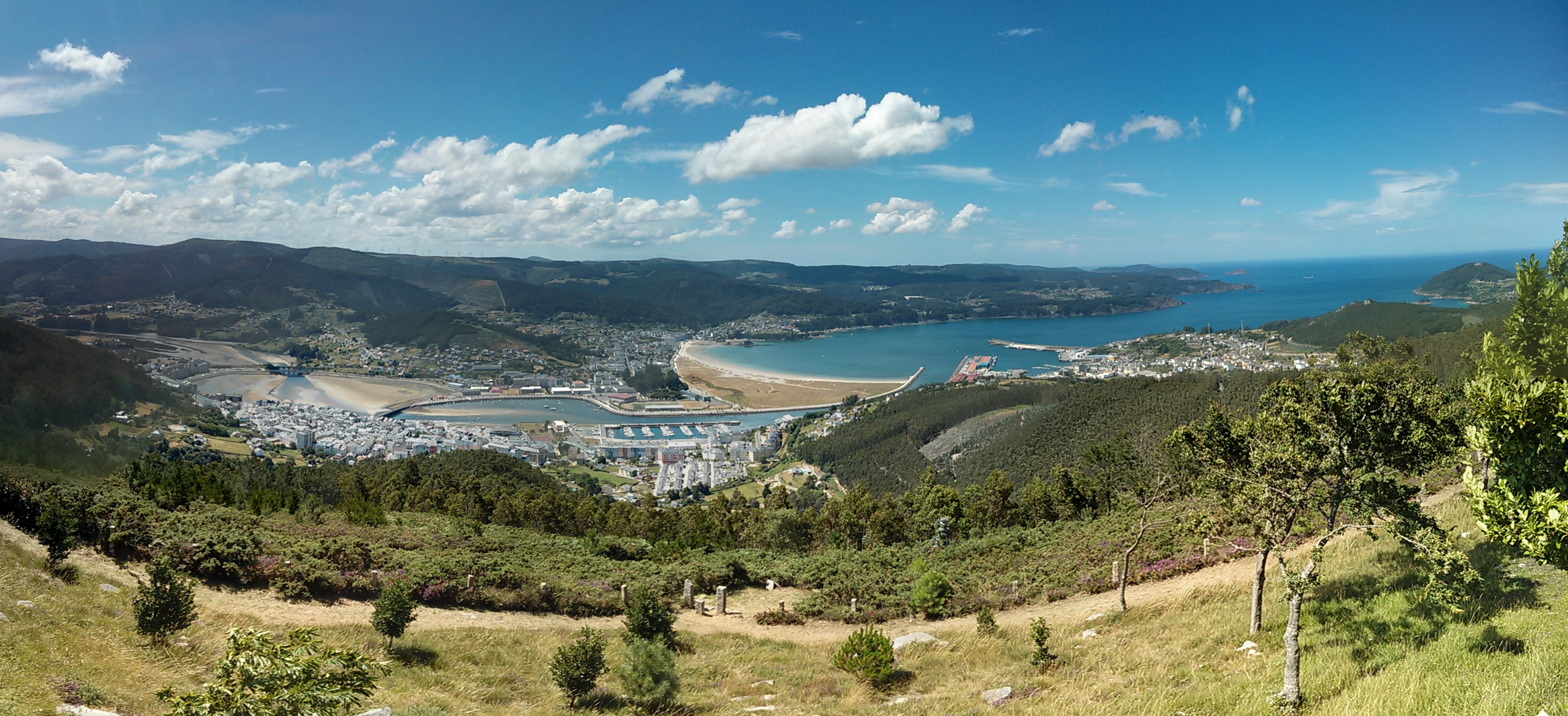
- Panoramic view

- Flag Coat of arms
- Location of Viveiro
- Location within Galicia Location within Spain
- Coordinates: 43°38′53″N 7°35′24″W
- Country: Spain
- Community: Galicia
- Province: Lugo
- Comarca: A Mariña Occidental

Government
  - Mayor: María Loureiro García

Area
  - Total: 109.3 km^{2} (42.2 sq mi)
- Elevation: 12 m (39 ft)

Population (2025-01-01)
  - Total: 15,120
  - Density: 138.3/km^{2} (358.3/sq mi)
- Demonym: Viveirenses
- Time zone: UTC+1 (CET)
  - Summer (DST): UTC+2 (CEST)
- Postal code: 27850
- Website: Official website

Viveiro (Galician pronunciation: [biˈβejɾʊ]; Spanish: Vivero [biˈβeɾo]) is a town and municipality in the province of Lugo, in the autonomous community of Galicia, Spain. It belongs to the comarca of A Mariña Occidental. It borders on the Cantabrian Sea, to the west of Xove and to the east of O Vicedo. It has a residential population of over 16,000 (2010 figures), which however triples in the summer months with visitors to the coastal region.

== Geography and location ==
The climate is mild oceanic.

The municipality encompasses the township of Viveiro itself (the main population centre on the Lugo coast), and also the towns of Covas and Celeiro. More than half of the municipality's population live in these three centres.

Viveiro municipality is subdivided into several administrative areas (parroquias, or parishes): Area-Faro, Boimente, Chavín, Galdo, Landrove, Magazos, San Pedro, Valcarría, Celeiro, Vieiro, Covas and Viveiro.

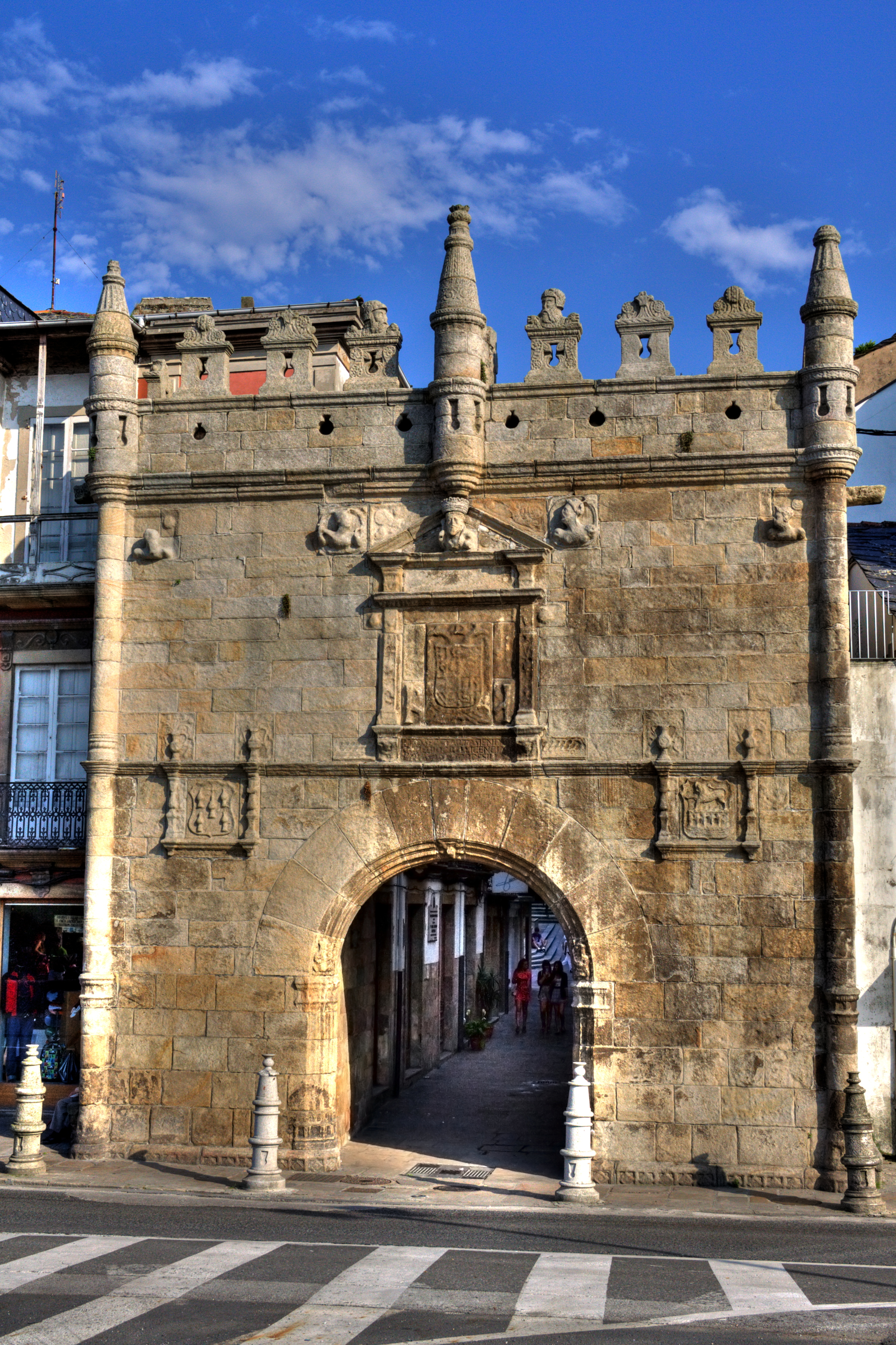
Carlos V Gate.

== Main sights ==
The old wall, of which only parts remain today, was built to protect the inhabitants from attacks or from the plague. The remains of the wall, which succumbed to modernity in spite of its importance and simplicity, are visible in the old part of the city although the remains are situated near small modern buildings. In spite of everything three of the wall's original gates survive: Vila, Valado, with a Romanesque style, and Castelo da Ponte, also called the gate of Carlos V, that is the emblem of Viveiro. This door has the sculpted imperial arms of the monarch, the original arms of the kingdom, and the arms of the city.

Some of the mansions of the city's noble families still exist, such as the gunsmith's house sculpted in stone. Religious buildings include the monastery of the Concepcion, which was founded by María das Alas Pumariño (died 1601), and the chapel of Ecce Homo, also called the chapel of Pity, which Rodrigo Alonso Alfeirán (died 1608) paid for.

The city is home to several Romanesque historical buildings. These include the churches of San Pedro, Santa María, and San Francisco. The bridge over the river Landro dates back to the medieval era too.

== Festivities ==
The calendar of Viveiro holds several festivals, both secular and religious.

=== Carnival ===
Viveiro's is the oldest Carnival in Galicia. It is celebrated during the four days before Lent, from Saturday until Shrove Tuesday. It concludes on Tuesday with a great procession of floats through the streets.

=== Holy Week ===
The Holy Week in Viveiro is one of the most important Holy Week celebrations in Galicia and it is also considered as a Fiesta of International Tourist Interest of Spain since 2013. Vivero has a great number of cofradías such as the Virgin of the Rosario, the Christ of the Piety, the Seven Last Words and the Holy Cross. The city is also home to processions such as the Encounter that show the Calvary of Christ with religious images, the Unnailed and St. Funeral that show the descent of the Cross to continue with the procession of St. Funeral, the Last Supper with the pasos of the supper, Horto, Ecce Homo, the Nazarene and Our Lady of Sorrows - Sufferings, the Passion, the Seven Words, the Piety and the Virgin at the foot of the Cross, a silent procession.

=== Rapa das Bestas ===
This festivity takes place the first Sunday of July except that the first of July coincides on Sunday then it celebrates the second Sunday in the Buio Mountains. It is an old tradition according to which people cut the horsehairs, brand the horses and break in them.

=== Patronal feasts ===
It celebrates on 15 August in Saint Roque and the Virgin's honour.

=== The pilgrimage of Naseiro (The pilgrimage of the good meal) ===
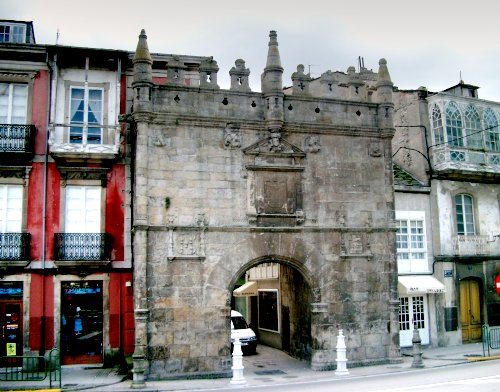
Porta Maior

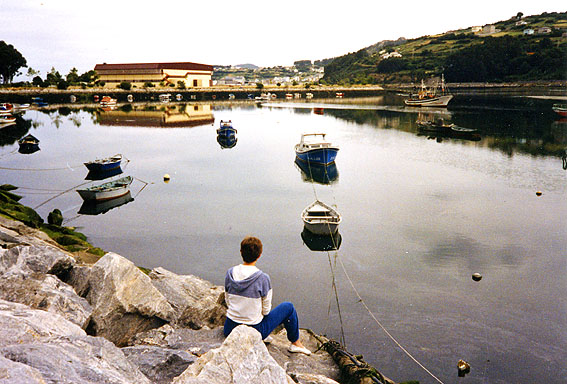
Ría de Viveiro

It celebrates the fourth Sunday of August.

=== Saint James' day ===
It celebrates on 25 July at the Port of Celeiro with a marine procession through the estuary of Viveiro.

=== Others ===
In the end of July or in the beginning of August, a music festival called Resurrection Fest, focused on metal, hardcore and punk is held in the city since 2006.

== Notable people ==
- Gómez Pérez das Mariñas (1539–1593), politician, diplomat and military officer, colonial governor of the Philippines
- Nicomedes Pastor Díaz (1811–1863), politician and Romantic writer
- Antón Vilar Ponte (1881–1936), writer and politician
- Jesús Cora y Lira (1890–1969), admiral and Carlist politician
- Maruja Mallo (1902–1995), surrealist painter
- Lois Tobío Fernández (1906–2003), journalist and philologist
- Carlos Oroza (born 1933–2015), poet

== International relations ==
=== Twin towns – sister cities ===
Viveiro is twinned with:

- Lannion, France
- Old Havana (Havana), Cuba
- Perth, Australia
