= Sor Mañón =

River in Spain

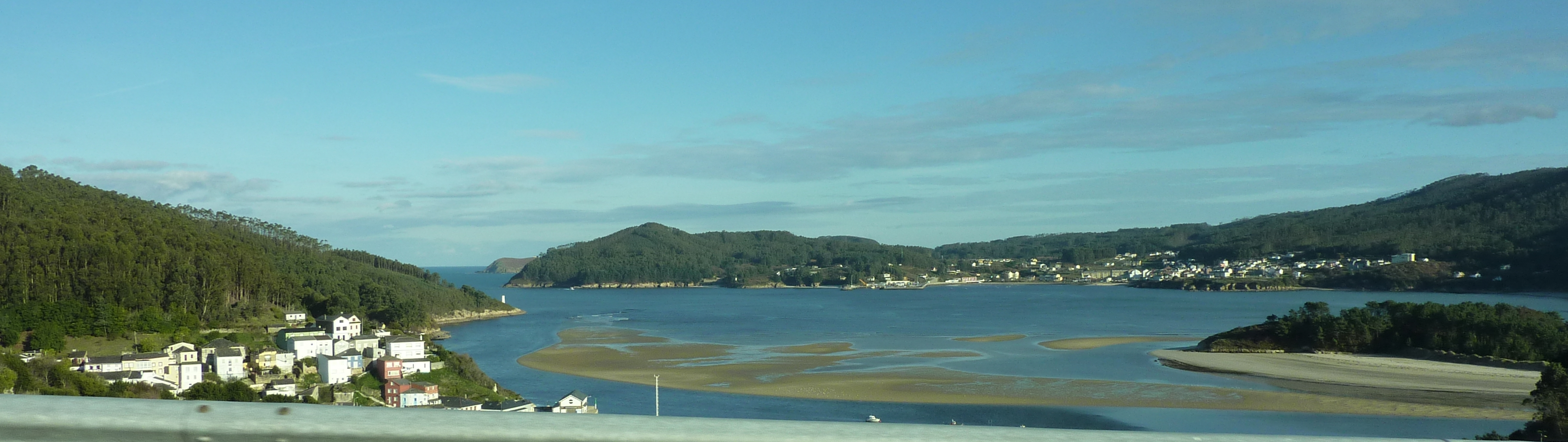
Ria do Barqueiro and river Sor Mañón

The Sor River or Sor Mañón flows between the provinces of A Coruña and Lugo, in the autonomous community of Galicia, Spain. It is 49 kilometres (30 mi) long.

The river has an impressive waterfall called Augas Caídas in Mañon parish.

The river Sor is the only river with salmon in Galicia, since unlike others it has not yet been dammed to form a reservoir for hydroelectric generation.

The estuary of the River Sor is the Ria do Barqueiro, 5 kilometres (3 mi) long. The river environment, geomorphology, and nearby landscape are of considerable interest.

== See also ==
- Rivers of Galicia
