= Mañón =

Concello de Mañón
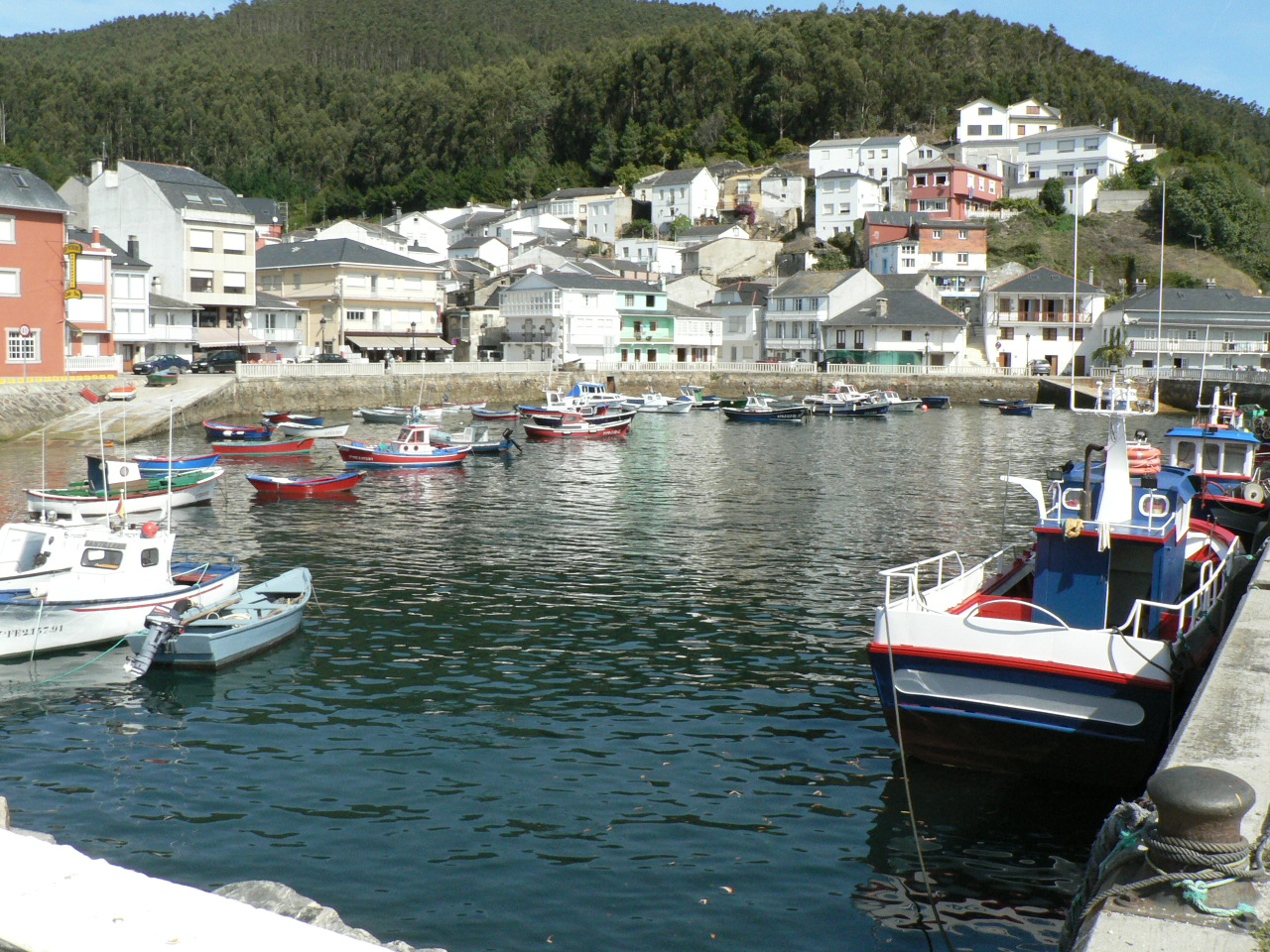

- Coat of arms

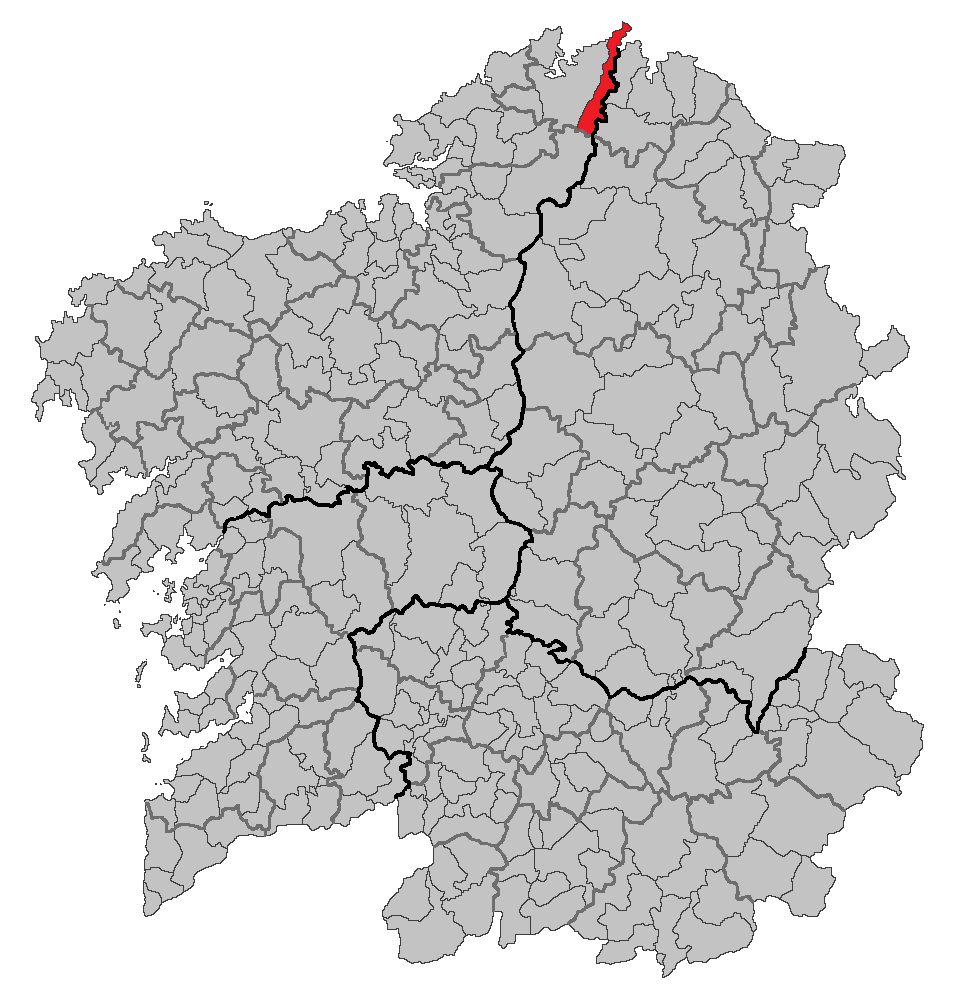
- Situation of Mañón within Galicia
- Parroquias: As Grañas do Sor, As Ribeiras do Sor, Bares, Mañón & Mogor

Area
  - Total: 81.1 km^{2} (31.3 sq mi)

Population (2025-01-01)
  - Total: 1,218
- Website: http://www.concellomanon.org

Mañón (Galician pronunciation: [maˈɲoŋ]), also registered in the past as Maañón 43°46′09.10″N 7°41′08.09″W, is a municipality in north-western Spain in the province of A Coruña, in the autonomous community of Galicia. It belongs to the comarca of Ortegal. Ferrolterra's population represents the third largest concentration of people in Galicia, and its disperse population exceeds 211,000 (2005).

== "O Barqueiro" and "Estaca de Bares" Ports ==
- Fishing port
- Sport port

== Geography, history and general information ==
Mañón belongs to the Ferrolterra region of Ortegal and it is made up by five parishes, with 2,032 inhabitants, who are disseminated over its 82.1 km^{2}.

This council forms a narrow and long band of land that joins mountain, river and sea. The fertile freshwater of the river Sor ploughs the rugged lands from south to north. The mountainous alignments of the Serra da Faladoira and Serra da Coriscada, the valleys of the Sor river and its estuary, and the peninsula that forms Estaca de Bares is known for its exceptional natural landscape.

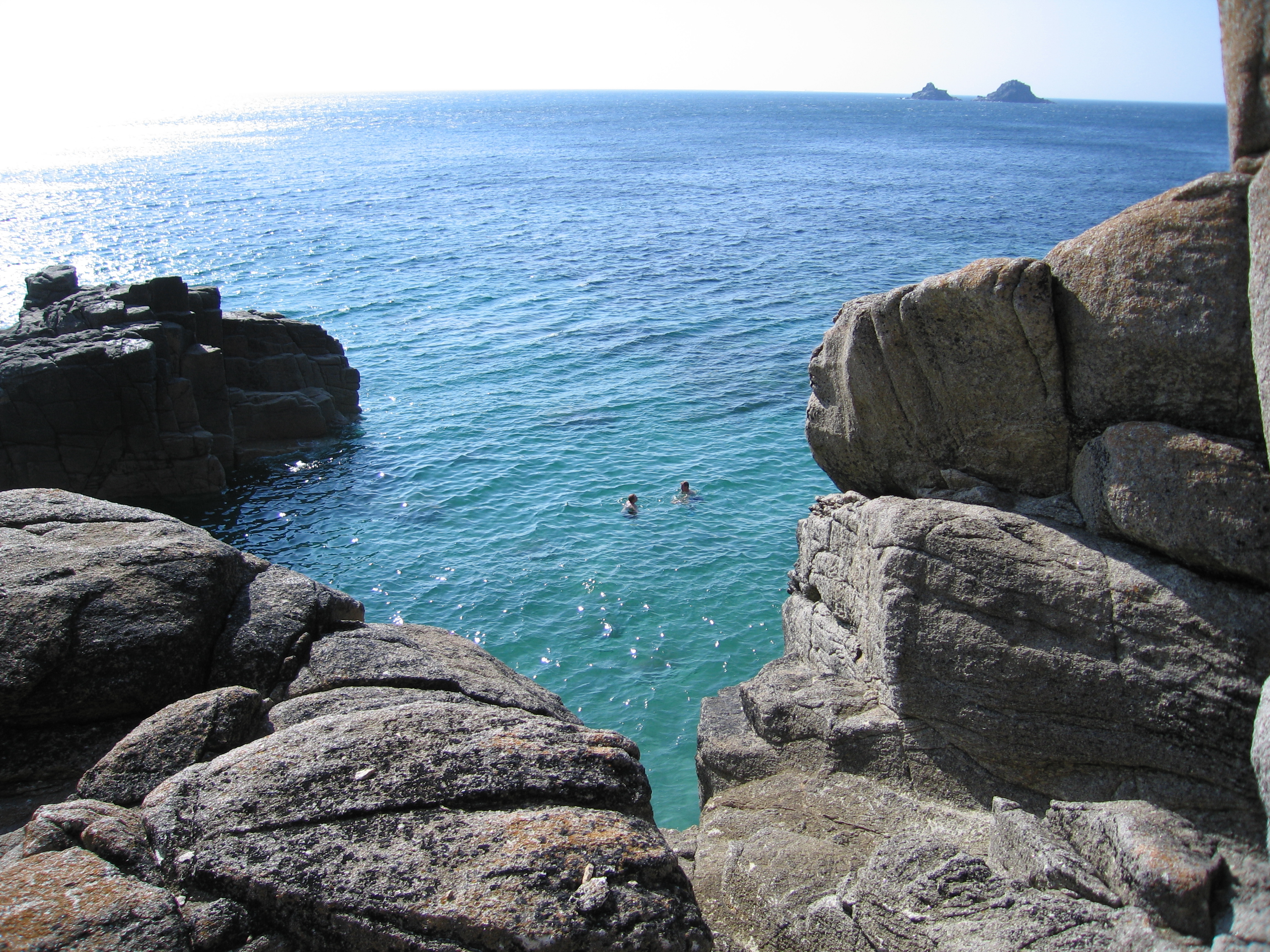
Example of a granite coast; typical of Galicia

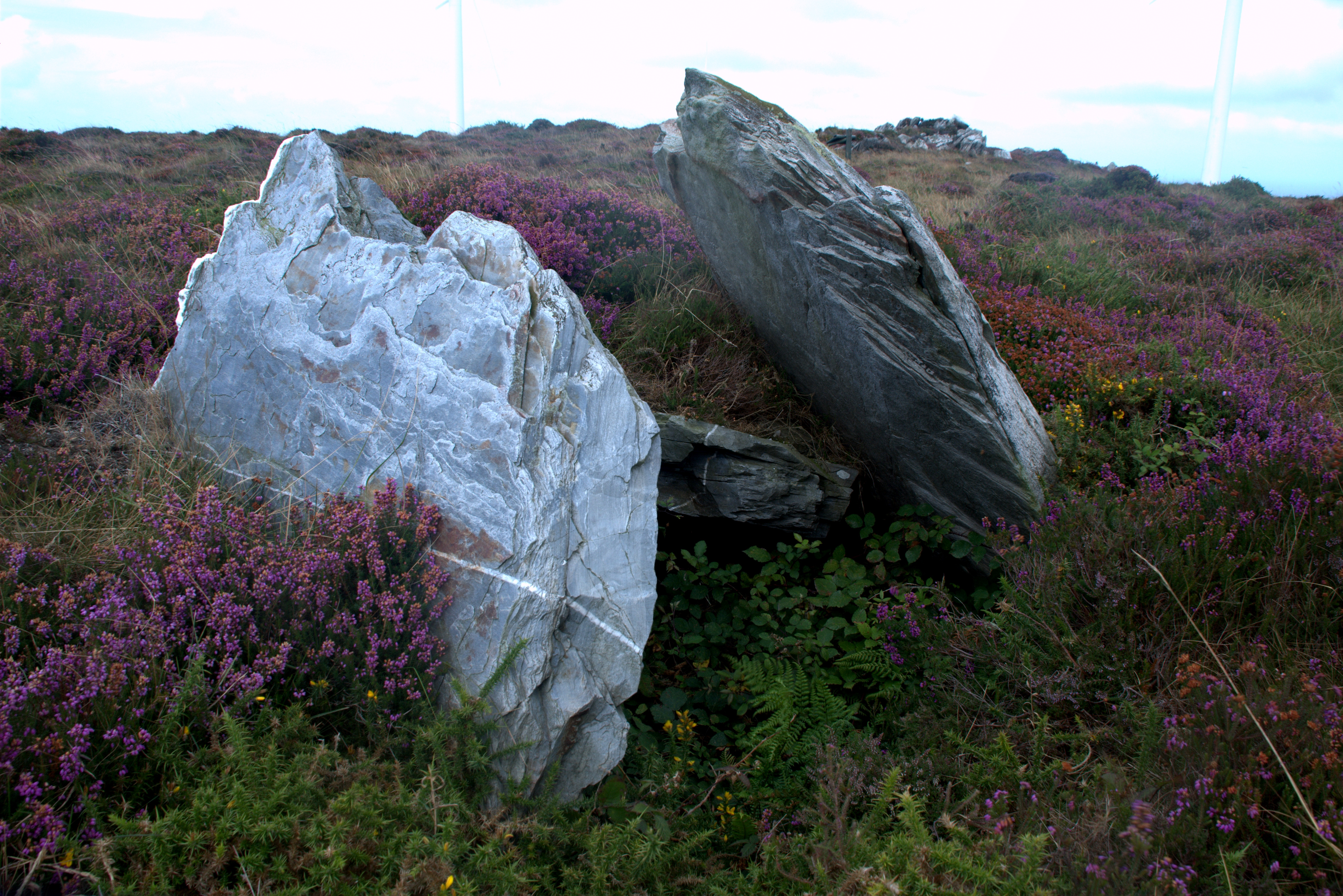
Remains of a dolmen in Pena Branca

At monumental level, they emphasize the prehistoric rest like mámoas of Estaca de Bares and the possibly prehistoric port (built in the Middle Ages according to other sources), in addition to the Roman necropolis in A Ponte do Porto.

Some of its parochial churches are worthy of mention considering its rusticity and integration to the surroundings.

Mañón has a very particular geographical structure; the river Sor ploughs deep valleys with plenty of vegetation, which contrasts with the leafy high areas of the mountain range. The serpentine shapes created by the Sor and its tributaries along their courses form a succession of inserted meanders, which form valleys with a lot of vegetation and rapid waterfalls. The weather is wet oceanic and the mild winters are followed by fresh summers. The rainfall is particularly abundant, but due to the relief, there are local microweathers, as happens in the banks of the river Sor, where the vegetation is partially responsible for the weather changes. These physical and weather conditions, as well as its situation between two seas, made Estaca de Bares to be declared a "natural area of national interest", and more recently, a protected area.

== Parishes ==
Bares, As Grañas (do Sor), Mañón, Mogor, As Ribeiras (do Sor)

== See also ==
- Ortegal comarca, north-western Spain.
- List of municipalities in A Coruña
