= List of islands by name (C) =

This article features a list of islands sorted by their name beginning with the letter C.

== C ==
Island's Name	Island group	Country/Dependency
Caballo	Manila Bay	Philippines
Cabanaas	Algarve islands	Portugal
Cabbage	Holston River, Tennessee	United States
Cabrera	Balearic Islands	Spain
Cacela	Algarve islands	Portugal
Caillou	Timbalier Bay,Louisiana	United States
Caja de Muertos	Puerto Rico	United States
Calayan	Babuyan Islands, Cagayan	Philippines
Calf of Eday	The North Isles, Orkney Islands	United Kingdom, Scotland
Calf of Flotta	The South Isles, Orkney Islands	United Kingdom, Scotland
Calf of Man	Isle of Man	(United Kingdom) Crown dependency
Callinan	Stoney Lake, Ontario	Canada
Calumet	Timbalier Bay, Louisiana	United States
Calvert	British Columbia	Canada
Cambalhão	Estremadura islands	Portugal
Camelot	St. Lawrence River, Ontario	Canada
Cameron	Nunavut	Canada
Cameron	Lake Joseph, Ontario	Canada
Camiguin Island	Mindanao	Philippines
Camiguin de Babuyanes	Babuyan Islands, Cagayan	Philippines
Camorta	Central group of the Nicobar Islands	India
Camp	Lake Winnipesaukee, New Hampshire	United States
Campania	British Columbia	Canada
Campbell	Torres Strait Islands, Queensland	Australia
Campbell	Campbell Islands	New Zealand
Campbell	British Columbia	Canada
Campbells	Mississippi River, Illinois	United States
Campobello	New Brunswick	Canada
Cancún	Caribbean, Quintana Roo	Mexico
Candlana Bar	Willamette River, Oregon	United States
Canna	Inner Hebrides	United Kingdom, Scotland
Isla del Caño	Bahia de Coronado	Costa Rica
Cannon Rock		Northern Ireland
Cantin	French River, Ontario	Canada
Cape Barren	Furneaux Group, Bass Strait, Tasmania	Australia
Cape Breton	Nova Scotia	Canada
Capraia	Tuscan Archipelago	Italy
Caprara	Tremiti Islands	Italy
Caprera	Maddalena archipelago, Sardinia	Italy
Capri	Gulf of Naples	Italy
Car	Lower Lough Erne	Ireland
Car Nicobar	Northern group of the Nicobar Islands	India
Cara	Inner Hebrides	United Kingdom, Scotland
Carcass	Falkland Islands	United Kingdom
Isla Carmen	Baja California Sur	Mexico
Carmen	Laguna de Términos, Campeche	Mexico
Carmines	York River, Virginia	United States
Carmona	Beira Baixa islands	Portugal
Caroline	Line Islands	Kiribati
Carpmael	Georgian Bay, Ontario	Canada
Carrington	Great Salt Lake, Utah	United States
Carroll	Mississippi River, Illinois	United States
Isla de La Cartuja	Guadalquivir River, Seville, Andalusia	Spain
Cascalheira	Alentejo islands	Portugal
Casse-Tete	Timbalier Bay, Louisiana	United States
Cast-off	Allegheny River, Pennsylvania	United States
Cat	Bahamas	Bahamas
Cat	Mascarene Islands	Mauritius
Cat	Mississippi River, Arkansas	United States
Cat	Apostle Islands, Wisconsin	United States
Cat	Gulf Coast, Mississippi	United States
Cát Bà	Hạ Long Bay	Vietnam
Catalina	Channel Islands of California, California	United States
Catalina De La Romana	La Romana	Dominican Republic
Çatalada	Aegean Sea	Turkey
Catanduanes	Catanduanes, Luzon	Philippines
Catfish	Missouri River, Missouri	United States
Caye Caulker	Caribbean	Belize
Cava	Orkney Islands	United Kingdom, Scotland
Caviana	Mouth of the Amazon River, Pará	Brazil
Cavus adasi	Kiremit islands group	Turkey
Cayman Brac	Cayman Islands	United Kingdom
Cebu	Visayas	Philippines
Cedar	St. Lawrence River, Ontario	Canada
Cedar	Willamette River, Oregon	United States
Cedros	Pacific Ocean, Baja California	Mexico
Central Coronado	Coronado Islands, Baja California	Mexico
Center	San Juan Islands, Washington	United States
Centre	Georgian Bay, Ontario	Canada
Cerf	Seychelles	Seychelles
Cessions Towhead	Mississippi River, Arkansas	United States
Cezi	Zhoushan	China
Chafarinas	Plazas de soberanía, Strait of Gibraltar	Spain
Champlain	Georgian Bay, Ontario	Canada
Champlain Monument	Georgian Bay, Ontario	Canada
Chandeleur	Louisiana	United States
Chandra	Bajuni Islands	Somalia
Ko Chang	Gulf of Thailand	Thailand
Changbai	Zhoushan Archipelago	China
Change	Newfoundland and Labrador	Canada
Changzhi	Zhoushan Archipelago	China
Chantry	Lake Huron, Ontario	Canada
Charles	Nunavut	Canada
Charles	Connecticut	United States
Charlton	Nunavut	Canada
Chases	Lake Winnipesaukee, New Hampshire	United States
Chausey	Channel Islands	France
Cheduba		Myanmar
Chek Lap Kok	Hong Kong	China
Chełminek	Oder Lagoon islands	Poland
Chelat	Lakshadweep	India
Chergui	Kerkenna Islands	Tunisia
Cheung Chau	Islands District, Hong Kong	China
Chick	Lake Erie, Ontario	Canada
Chicot	Louisiana	United States
Chief's	Lake Joseph, Ontario	Canada
Chiefs	Lake Couchiching, Ontario	Canada
Chillicothe	Illinois River, Illinois	United States
Chiloane		Mozambique
Chiloé	Chiloé Archipelago	Chile
Isla Chincha Centro	Chincha Islands	Peru
Isla Chincha Norte	Chincha Islands	Peru
Isla Chincha Sur	Chincha Islands	Peru
Chios	Aegean Islands	Greece
Chira	Gulf of Nicoya	Costa Rica
Chirinkotan	Kuril Islands Sakhalin Oblast	Russia
Chirpoy	Kuril Islands Sakhalin Oblast	Russia
Chizumulu	Lake Malawi	Malawi
Choctaw Island No. 78	Mississippi River, Arkansas	United States
Choiseul	Melanesia	Solomon Islands
Choupique	Louisiana	United States
Chouteau	Mississippi River, Illinois	United States
Chovaye	Bajuni Islands	Somalia
Chowra	Central group of the Nicobar Islands	India
Christian	Georgian Bay, Ontario	Canada
Christmas (Christmas Island)	Indian Ocean	Self-governing Territory of Australia
Chrysi		Greece
Cula	Bajuni Islands	Somalia
Churchill	Georgian Bay,Ontario	Canada
Cicia	Lau Islands of Fiji	Fiji
Čiovo		Croatia
Île de la Cité	Seine River, Paris	France
City	Halifax River, Florida	United States
City	Florida	United States
City	Mississippi River, Iowa	United States
City	The Bronx, New York	United States
City	Susquehanna River, Pennsylvania	United States
Clackamette	Willamette River, Oregon	United States
Clare	Clew Bay islands	Ireland
Clarence	South Shetland Islands	Claimed by Argentine Antarctica, Argentina, Antártica Chilena Province of Chile, and the British Antarctic Territory of theUnited Kingdom
Isla Clarión	Revillagigedo Islands, Colima	Mexico
Clarion	Allegheny River, Pennsylvania	United States
Clark	San Juan Islands, Washington	United States
Clarksville	Mississippi River, Illinois	United States
Clear		Ireland
Cleenishmeen	Lower Lough Erne	Ireland
Clipperton	Pacific Ocean	France
Clooney	Louisiana	United States
Cloquet	Mississippi River, Minnesota	United States
Club	Georgian Bay, Ontario	Canada
Club	St. Lawrence River, Ontario	Canada
Coats	Nunavut	Canada
Cobra	Algarve islands	Portugal
Coburg	Nunavut	Canada
Cockburn	Lake Huron, Ontario	Canada
Cayo Coco	Greater Antilles	Cuba
Coco	Algarve islands	Portugal
Cocos	Pacific Ocean	Costa Rica
Cocos	Guam	United States
Cod	Newfoundland and Labrador	Canada
Coelleira	Galicia	Spain
Coëtivy	Seychelles	Seychelles
Cogley	Allegheny River, Pennsylvania	United States
Coiba	Veraguas	Panama
Coleman	Mississippi River, Illinois	United States
Coll	Inner Hebrides	United Kingdom, Scotland
Collanmore	Clew Bay islands	Ireland
Colonsay	Inner Hebrides	United Kingdom, Scotland
Comfort	Louisiana	United States
Comino	Kemmuna, Maltese Islands	Malta
Cominotto	Maltese Islands	Malta
Côn Sơn	Côn Đảo	Vietnam
Conanicut	Narragansett Bay, Rhode Island	United States
Conception	Seychelles	Seychelles
Conejera	Balearic Islands	Spain
Conejo	Gulf of Fonseca	Honduras
Constance Island	St. Lawrence River, Ontario	Canada
Constance Island	Andaman Islands, Indian Ocean	India
Isla Contadora	Pearl Islands	Panama
Cook		Cook Islands(self-governing in free association with New Zealand)
Coon	Mississippi River, Illinois	United States
Coon	Louisiana	United States
Copinsay	Orkney Islands	United Kingdom, Scotland
Coquet	England	United Kingdom
Coreille	Ottawa River, Ontario	Canada
Corfu	Ionian Islands	Greece
Corisco	Río Muni estuary	Equatorial Guinea
Corn Holm	Orkney Islands	United Kingdom, Scotland
Cornwall	Nunavut	Canada
Cornwall	St. Lawrence River, Ontario	Canada
Cornwallis	Nunavut	Canada
Cornwallis	South Shetland Islands	Claimed by Argentine Antarctica, Argentina, Antártica Chilena Province of Chile, and the British Antarctic Territory of theUnited Kingdom
Coron		Philippines
Coronation	South Orkney Islands	Claimed by the United Kingdom as part of the Falkland Islands and by Argentina
Corratistune	Upper Lough Erne	Ireland
Corregidor	Manila Bay	Philippines
Corsica		France
Cortes	Discovery Islands, British Columbia	Canada
Corvo	Azores	Portugal
Cosmoledo	Outer Islands of the Seychelles	Seychelles
Cotnam	Ottawa River, Ontario	Canada
Cottel	Newfoundland and Labrador	Canada
Cottonwood Bar	Mississippi River, Louisiana	United States
Couba	Mississippi River, Louisiana	United States
Coughran's	Lower Lough Erne	Ireland
Courson	Allegheny River, Pennsylvania	United States
Cousin	Seychelles	Seychelles
Cousine	Seychelles	Seychelles
Cove	Lake Huron, Ontario	Canada
Cove	Lake Winnipesaukee, New Hampshire	United States
Cow	Rice Lake, Ontario	Canada
Cow	Lake Winnipesaukee, New Hampshire	United States
Cox	British Columbia	Canada
Cozumel	Caribbean	Mexico
Cracroft	British Columbia	Canada
Cranberry	Lake Huron, Ontario	Canada
Crane	San Juan Islands, Washington	United States
Crawford	Georgian Bay, Ontario	Canada
Credit	Mississippi River, Iowa	United States
Cres	Adriatic Sea	Croatia
Crescent	Bay of Isles, South Georgia	British overseas territory
Crescent	Georgian Bay, Ontario	Canada
Crete		Greece
Crevinishaughy	Lower Lough Erne	Ireland
Crim Rocks	Isles of Scilly	United Kingdom
Crooked	Florida	United States
Crosier	Charleston Lake, Ontario	Canada
Crowlin	Inner Hebrides	United Kingdom, Scotland
Crown	Lake Muskoka, Ontario	Canada
Crown Prince Frederik	Nunavut	Canada
Crozier	Kennedy Channel, Greenland	Denmark
Cruls (also known as Crulls Islands)	Wilhelm Archipelago	Antarctica
Crull's	Allegheny River, Pennsylvania	United States
Crump Island	Lesser Antilles	Antigua and Barbuda
Cruninish	Lower Lough Erne	Ireland
Cseke-sziget	Danube River	Hungary
Csepel-sziget	Danube River	Hungary
Cuba	Greater Antilles	Cuba
Culatra	Algarve islands	Portugal
Cu Lao Dung	Hau River	Vietnam
Culebra	Causeway Islands, Panama Canal	Panama
Culebrita	Culebra archipelago, Puerto Rico	United States
Cumberland	Ohio River, Kentucky	United States
Cunda	Aegean Sea	Turkey
Curaçao	Lesser Antilles	Kingdom of the Netherlands
Curieuse	Seychelles	Seychelles
Cuttyhunk	Elizabeth Islands, Massachusetts	United States
Île aux Cygnes	Seine River, Paris	France
Cypress	San Juan Islands, Washington	United States
Cyprus	Cyprus	Cyprus and Akrotiri and Dhekelia, United Kingdom sovereign base areas. (Northern Cyprus claims and controls one third of the island, although this is not recognised by any country except Turkey.)

== See also ==
- List of islands (by country)
- List of islands by area
- List of islands by population
- List of islands by highest point
