= Project 912 patrol boat =

Series of Polish patrol boats

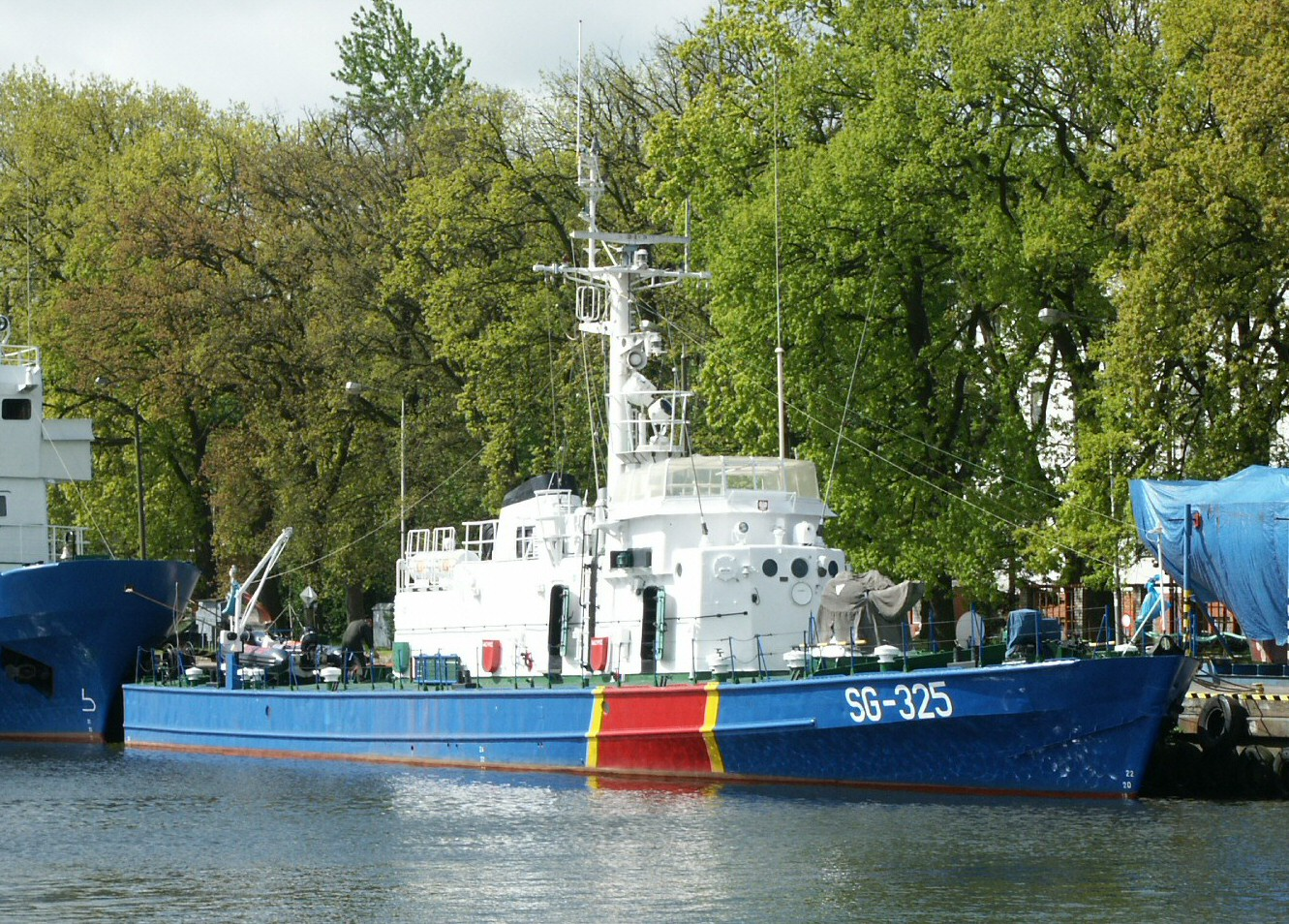
- SG-325, former ORP Tęcza in 2004

Class overview
- Builders: Polish Navy Shipyard, Gdynia
- Operators: Border Protection Forces, Border Guard
- In service: 1965−2005
- Planned: 5

General characteristics
- Displacement: standard: 208 t (205 long tons; 229 short tons); normal: 220 t (220 long tons; 240 short tons); full: 232 t (228 long tons; 256 short tons)
- Length: 41.34 m (135.6 ft)
- Beam: 6.2 m (20 ft)
- Draft: max. 2.42 m (7 ft 11 in)
- Propulsion: 2 × 40DM diesel engines, 2,200 hp (max 2,400 hp), 2 propellers
- Speed: 24 kn (44 km/h; 28 mph)
- Crew: 28
- Armament: 2 × twin AK-230 30 mm guns; 12–24 depth charges on two racks or 4 naval mines

Project 912 class (in NATO code: Obluze) is a series of Polish patrol boats constructed in the 1960s at the Polish Navy Shipyard for the Border Protection Forces. Five vessels of this type were built and commissioned between 1965 and 1968. They initially served in the Maritime Brigade of Border Guard Vessels, and after its dissolution in 1991, they joined the newly formed Polish Border Guard, reinforcing the Maritime Unit of the Border Guard. Their withdrawal began in 1996, with the first vessel decommissioned, and the last vessel of the series lowered its flag in 2008. These vessels were further developed into the Project 912M submarine chasers.

== Design and construction ==
Due to the significant demand for patrol boats for the Border Protection Forces in the 1960s, efforts were made to acquire new, large patrol boats. Despite a positive evaluation of the Project 902 patrol boats, there was no decision to continue their construction or develop their design further; instead, a completely new type of patrol boat was designed, designated Project 912. The chief designer was Engineer Tadeusz Bylewski. Initially, it was decided to entrust the construction to the Northern Shipyard in Gdańsk due to its extensive experience in building such vessels and its suitable technical facilities; this choice was further supported by the shipyard's successful delivery of Project 902 vessels. However, the construction was ultimately assigned to the Gdynia-based Polish Navy Shipyard. This decision was likely made at a political level. Between late 1963 and early 1964, responsibility and documentation for the vessels' construction were transferred between the shipyards to initiate the process.

In early 1964, the Maritime Service Directorate of the Border Protection Forces ordered five vessels, scheduled for construction between 1965 and 1967. The construction faced numerous challenges due to a lack of skilled personnel and inadequate technological infrastructure. These issues included difficulties in recruiting qualified workers and rising preparatory costs. In May 1964, the terms of a contract were finalized for the development of technical documentation, construction, and delivery of the vessels, which were to be handed over by September 1967. Construction of the lead ship began in July 1964, with its hull launched on 29 April 1965. The vessel underwent several design changes compared to initial plans, affecting displacement and dimensions.

Construction of two serial vessels began in 1965. The first was launched in November 1965, and the second in April 1966. Work on the final two patrol boats started in 1966, with launches in September and December of that year. The vessels were delivered to the recipient between 1965 and 1967. Five vessels were built and commissioned into the Border Protection Forces and, from 1967, the Maritime Brigade of Border Guard Vessels. These units supplemented the older Project 902 patrol boats. They were designated Obluze (Obłuże) in NATO code.

Following the establishment of the Polish Border Guard in 1991, all five Project 912 vessels were transferred from the Polish Navy to the Maritime Unit of the Border Guard on 18 June 1991, joining the Baltic Border Guard Division and remaining stationed in Kołobrzeg. The first two vessels were decommissioned in 1996 and 1997, with the last two withdrawn in 2006 and 2008.

Based on the Project 912 design, eight Project 912M submarine chasers were developed.

Overview of Project 912 vessels
Name in the Polish Navy (original, later)	Name in the Maritime Unit of the Border Guard	Commissioned	Decommissioned
OP-301 → OP-321 → ORP Fala	SG-321	28 July 1965	14 June 1996
OP-302 → OP-322 → ORP Szkwał	SG-322	8 September 1966	10 September 1997
OP-303 → OP-323 → ORP Zefir	SG-323	10 June 1967	14 June 2006
OP-324 → ORP Zorza	SG-324	31 January 1968	22 October 1998
OP-325 → ORP Tęcza	SG-325	31 January 1968	18 March 2008

== Design ==
=== General description ===
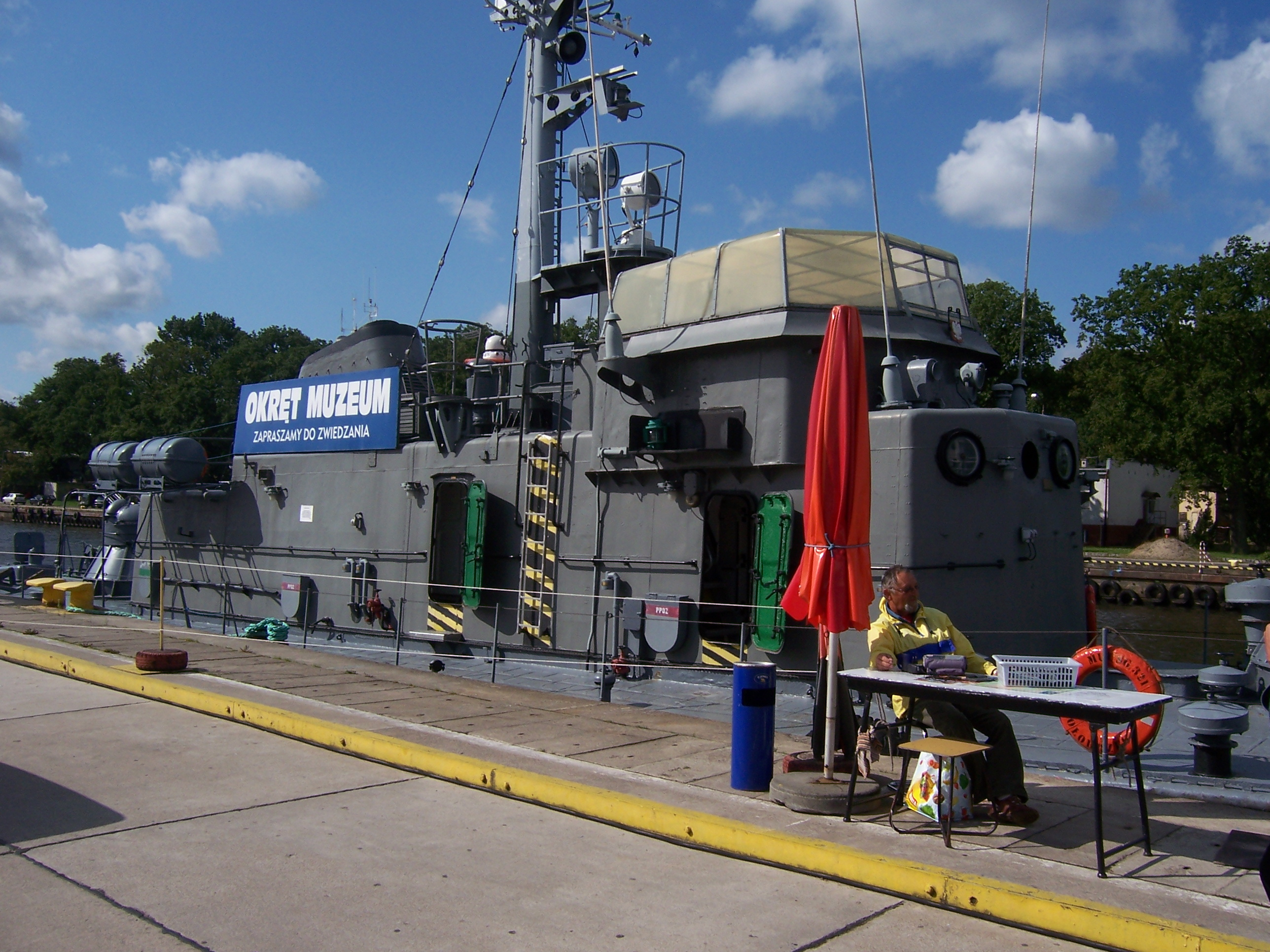
Superstructure of ORP Fala

Project 912 patrol boats measured 41.34 m in length, 6.2 m in width, with a draft of 1.7 m at the bow and 2.26 m at the stern at standard displacement. At full displacement, the draft increased to 1.85 m at the bow and 2.42 m at the stern. They had a standard displacement of 208 tonnes, a normal displacement of 220 tonnes, and a full displacement of 232 tonnes. Built as conventional monohull vessels with a steel structure, these patrol boats could operate at a sea state of 6 and were guaranteed unfloodability with one fully flooded watertight compartment. Their endurance was 12 days. The crew consisted of 28 officers and sailors.

The forward hull section housed a boatswain's storeroom, anchor chain locker, a wardroom for 10 crew members, a sonar station room, a gyrocompass room, the commander's cabin, cabins for non-commissioned officers and officers, and an ammunition magazine for the bow AK-230 gun, located directly beneath it. The midship contained the engine room, while the aft hull section included the ammunition magazine for the stern AK-230 gun, crew quarters, and the lazarette with the steering engine and depth charge drop slots, released through closable openings in the transom.

The deckhouse featured a backup command post and bridge in the forward section. It also contained a radio room, chart room, engine room hatch, and toilet facilities. On the deckhouse roof were the exposed main command post, a mast with the vessel's electronic equipment, and the Kolonka fire control system station for the AK-230 guns.

=== Propulsion system ===
The propulsion system comprised two main engines, diesel 40DM units, each producing 2500 hp. Each engine drove a single propeller shaft, terminating in one propeller. The engines were housed in a single-compartment engine room. Electrical power was supplied by three 40YDZ generator sets, each rated at 40 kVA. Behind the main engines was the Maneuvering and Distribution Control Center. The vessels carried a maximum fuel load of 24.5 tonnes. They could achieve a top speed of 24 knots, though the prototype ORP Fala reached 25 knots during sea trials.

=== Electronic equipment ===
The electronic equipment included:

- Radar station Reja (the last two vessels were equipped with RM-2 radars);
- radio direction finder APR-50R;
- sonar MG-11 Tamir;
- echo sounder SP-402R;
- Kolonka artillery fire control system;
- radio communication stations R-609M, 1414/3, and FM-302/I;
- IFF system (except on the last two vessels);
- KDU-2M contamination detection system.

=== Armament ===
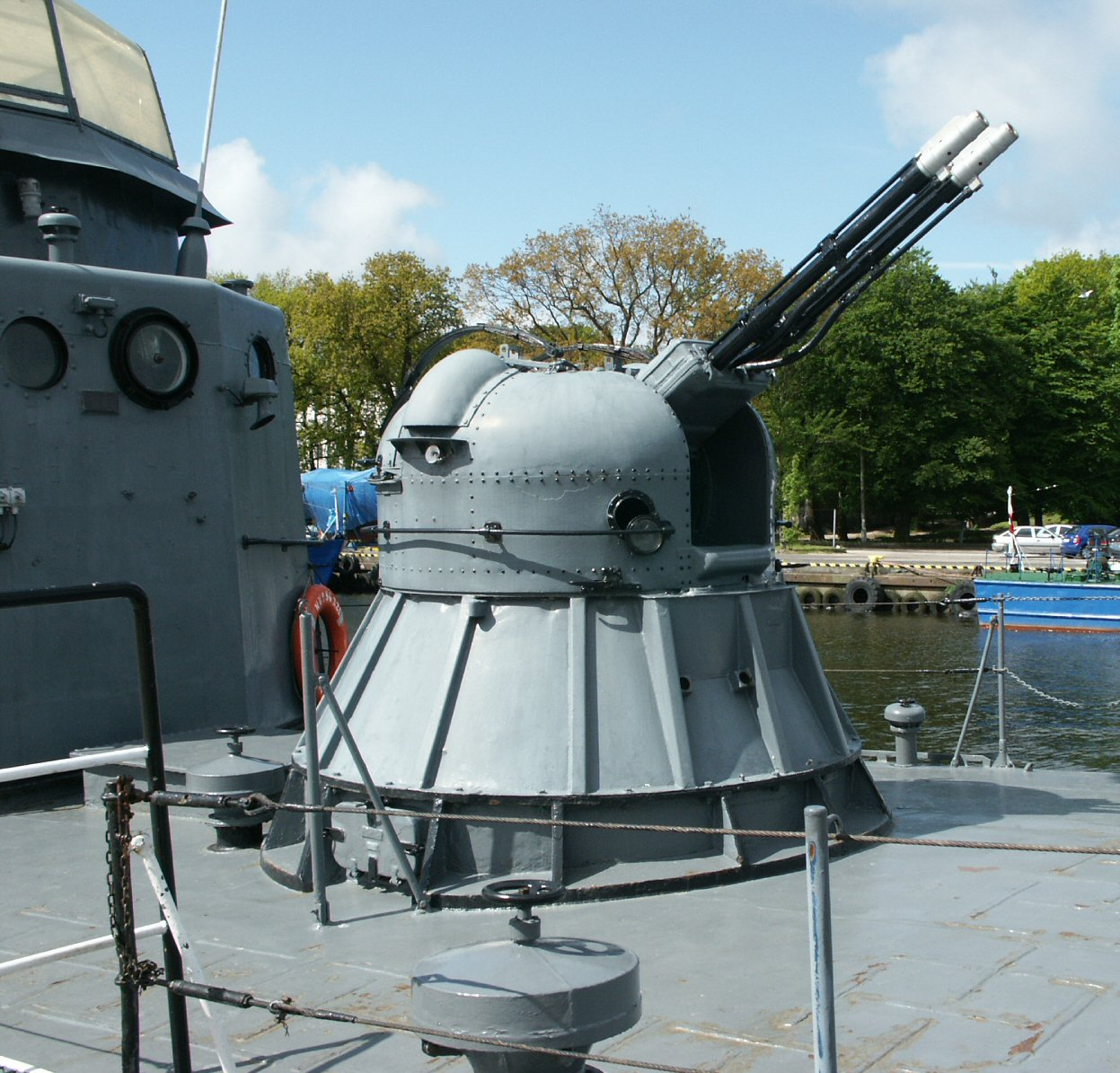
AK-230 gun on ORP Fala

The armament consisted of two naval dual-purpose automatic AK-230 guns of 30 mm caliber in a 2 × II configuration (on SG-324 and SG-325, only one twin gun was installed from the start of service). These were the first Polish vessels equipped with AK-230 guns. Despite plans, the vessels did not receive artillery radar MR-104 units, which were later introduced on the Project 912M submarine chasers. The guns were aimed using the Kolonka optical sight. The AK-230 is a Soviet naval artillery system based on two 30 mm autocannon NN-30 guns. Designed to engage surface and air targets, it had a maximum range of 6,500 m and 4,000 m, respectively. The system allowed 360° firing with barrel elevation angles from -5° to +87°. The gun assembly weighed 1,900 kg without ammunition. One gun was mounted on the bow deck, the other aft of the deckhouse.

In addition to the twin AK-230 guns, the vessels carried two depth charge racks at the stern, capable of holding up to 12 gravity depth charges B-1 or 4 naval mines ADM-1000. Charges were released through closable transom openings. Additional racks for 12 more charges could be mounted on deck mine rails.

== Service ==
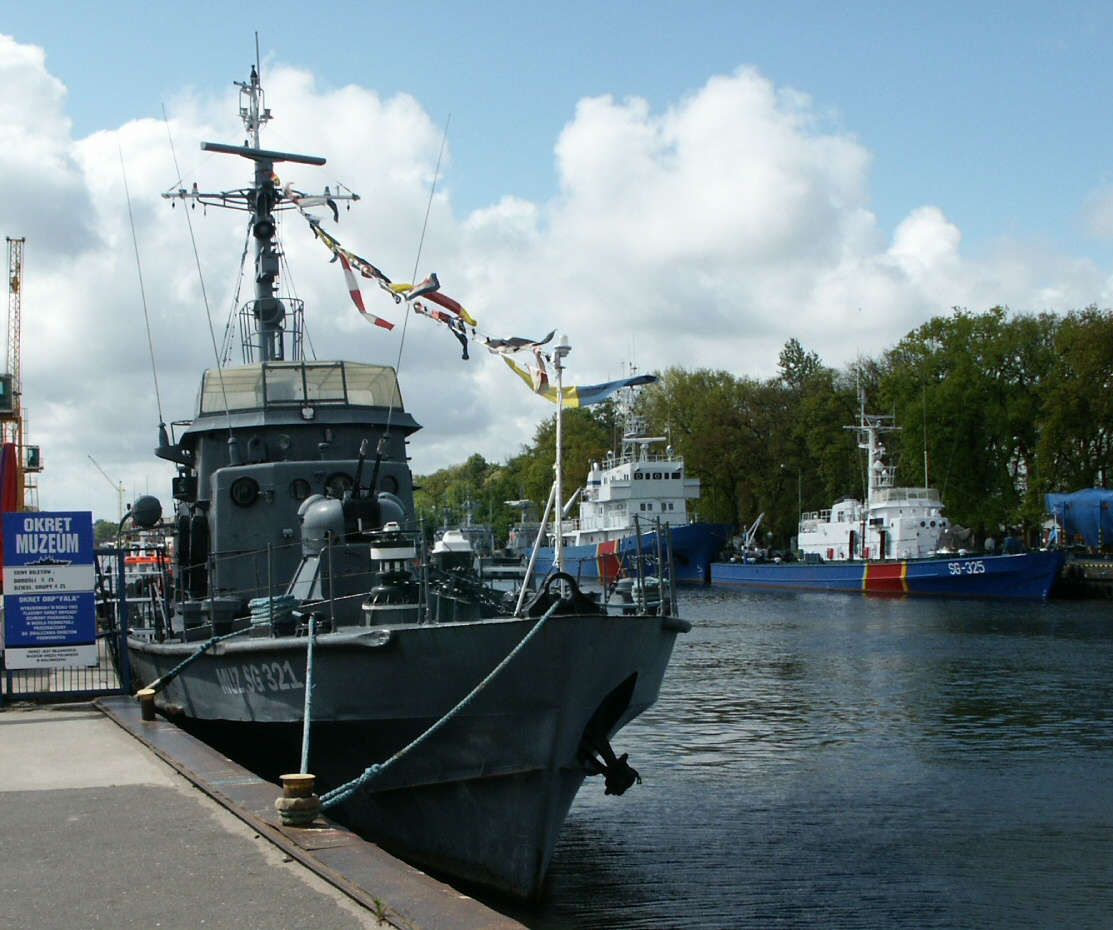
ORP Fala as a museum ship still afloat (2004), with sister ship SG-325 (former ORP Tęcza) and Kaper-2 in the background

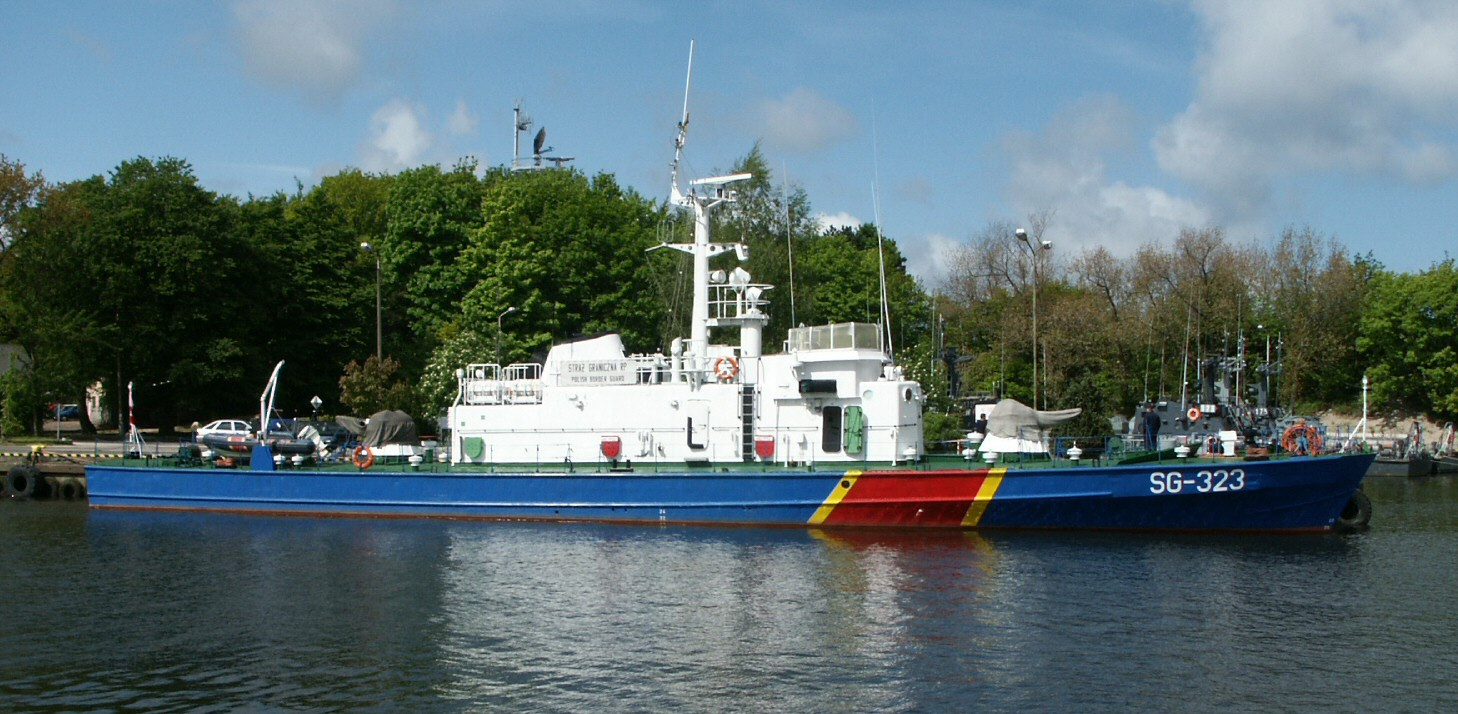
SG-323, former ORP Zefir, during service (2004)

The vessels were delivered between 1965 and 1967. They were initially assigned to the 6th Border Guard Vessel Brigade, which became the Maritime Brigade of Border Guard Vessels in 1967. The first three vessels received designations OP-301, OP-302, and OP-303, but with the Maritime Brigade of Border Guard Vessels' formation in 1967, they were named with hull numbers: ORP Fala (321), ORP Szkwał (322), and ORP Zefir (323). These were commissioned in 1965, 1966, and 1967, respectively. The last two vessels, initially numbered 324 and 325, were renamed ORP Zorza (324) and ORP Tęcza (325). They entered service on 31 January 1968. They were intended for surveillance and patrol duties on Polish territorial waters, and in wartime, for group searches of submarines and coastal transport protection. They supplemented the older Project 902 patrol boats and were designated Obluze (Obłuże) in NATO code.

After the Polish Border Guard's creation in 1991, all five Project 912 vessels were transferred from the Polish Navy to the Maritime Unit of the Border Guard on 18 June 1991, joining the Baltic Border Guard Division in Kołobrzeg. They received designations SG-321 to SG-325, matching their prior hull numbers. The first two, SG-321 and SG-322, were decommissioned in 1996 and 1997. SG-324 was retired in 1998, and the last two, SG-323 and SG-325, were withdrawn in 2006 and 2008, concluding 43 years of state service.

The former ORP Fala was converted into a museum ship in 1996. Initially moored at Kołobrzeg's port quay, it was later lifted from the water and moved to the Kołobrzeg Maritime Museum, part of the Museum of Polish Arms. Two vessels were sold to private firms: SG-322 to Perfekt of Białogard on 11 September 1997, and SG-324 to Ancora of Gdańsk on 6 April 1999. SG-324, renamed Odys as a civilian vessel, was scrapped in Gdańsk in 2004.

=== Evaluation ===
Although Project 912 vessels were more modern than Project 902 patrol boats, they were not considered successful. The older Project 902 units were deemed more effective and suitable for the Maritime Brigade of Border Guard Vessels. Advantages included strong armament with two AK-230 gun sets and advanced electronics, such as radioactivity detection capabilities, but their tasks were more suited to the Polish Navy than the Border Protection Forces, whose primary role was patrolling and protecting borders. A major flaw was the poorly designed hull line, which created a bow wave at maximum speed, generating significant drag. The vessels were costly to acquire − due to construction issues and defects identified during trials that required fixes − and to operate. Though modern at the time of commissioning, they suffered from the Naval Shipyard's inexperience in building such units, and some technological solutions proved "temporary", leading to operational challenges.

== Bibliography ==
- Goryński, Grzegorz (2013). "Historia budowy okrętów patrolowych projektu 912. Część 1" [History of the Construction of Project 912 Patrol Boats, Part 1]. Morze, Statki i Okręty (in Polish). 12. Magnum X. ISSN 1426-529X.
- Goryński, Grzegorz (2014). "Historia budowy okrętów patrolowych projektu 912. Część 2" [History of the Construction of Project 912 Patrol Boats, Part 2]. Morze, Statki i Okręty (in Polish). 1–2. Magnum X. ISSN 1426-529X.
