= Cedar Island =

Cedar Island may refer to:

== Canada ==
- Cedar Island (Kingsville), in Kingsville, Ontario
- Cedar Island (Niagara River), in Niagara Falls, Ontario

== United States ==
- Cedar Island (Alaska)
- Cedar Island (Clinton, Connecticut), a former island, now a peninsula
- Cedar Island Wildlife Management Area, Maryland
- Cedar Island (Dukes County, Massachusetts)
- Cedar Island, in Cass Lake
- Cedar Island, half of which is in Cedar Island State Park, New York
- Cedar Island, North Carolina, an island and an unincorporated community
  - Cedar Island National Wildlife Refuge, near the island
- Cedar Island (Oregon)
- Cedar Island, South Carolina
