= List of shipwrecks in October 1890 =

The list of shipwrecks in October 1890 includes ships sunk, foundered, grounded, or otherwise lost during October 1890.

== 1 October ==
List of shipwrecks: 1 October 1890
Ship	State	Description
Alice	United Kingdom	The barque was driven out of a dry dock at Glasson Dock, Lancashire. She collided with Alice Latham and Lancashire Lad (both United Kingdom) and sank.
Antelope	United Kingdom	The fishing smack collided with the barque Arne (Norway) in the North Sea and was severely damaged. She put in to Lowestoft, Suffolk.
Challenger	United Kingdom	The steam trawler suffered a boiler explosion and sank at North Shields, Northumberland. Her four crew survived.
Clara	Sweden	The schooner sank at Degerhamn.
Glenrath	United Kingdom	The steamship struck the wreck of the steamship Aberlady Bay (United Kingdom) and sank off Cape Lookout, North Carolina, United States. Her 21 crew survived. She was on a voyage from Pensacola, Florida, United States to Antwerp, Belgium.
Melingue	France	The brigantine foundered in the English Channel 3 nautical miles (5.6 km) south of The Lizard, Cornwall. United Kingdom with the loss of two of her five crew. Survivors were rescued by the steamship Tyne (United Kingdom). Melingue was on a voyage from Swansea, Glamorgan, United Kingdom to Bordeaux, Gironde.
Swan	United Kingdom	The yacht foundered in the Irish Sea with the loss of all three crew. She was on a voyage from Whitehaven to Millom, Cumberland.
No. 544	United Kingdom	The fishing yawl was wrecked at Aberdeen. Her four crew were rescued by the Aberdeen Lifeboat.

== 2 October ==
List of shipwrecks: 2 October 1890
Ship	State	Description
Belle	United Kingdom	The barquentine ran aground off Weston-super-Mare, Somerset. She was on a voyage from Runcorn, Cheshire to Plymouth, Devon.
Einighen	Germany	The yacht foundered in the Baltic Sea off Borkum.
Larissa	United Kingdom	The collier, a brig, ran aground on the Shipwash Sand, in the North Sea off the coast of Suffolk. Her eight crew were rescued by the Harwich Lifeboat Albert Edward ( Royal National Lifeboat Institution). Larissa was on a voyage from North Shields, Northumberland to Sheerness, Kent.
Phoenix	Denmark	The schooner foundered in the North Sea off St. Abb's Head, Berwickshire, United Kingdom. Her crew were rescued. She was on a voyage from Rochester, Kent to the Firth of Forth
Zweibrüder	Germany	The schooner foundered in the North Sea off Heligoland.
Three unnamed vessels	Flags unknown	The ships foundered in the North Sea.
Unnamed	Flag unknown	The schooner foundered off Borkum, Germany with the loss of all hands.

== 3 October ==
List of shipwrecks: 3 October 1890
Ship	State	Description
Fannie C.	Austria-Hungary	The brigantine caught fire and was beached at Chesil Beach, Dorset, United Kingdom. Her crew were rescued by rocket apparatus. Fannie C. was on a voyage from Hamburg, Germany to Buenos Aires, Argentina. She became a total loss.
Iroquois	United States	The steamship arrived at New York on fire. She was on a voyage from Charleston, South Carolina to New York. The fire was extinguished.
Lily	United Kingdom	The brigantine was wrecked on La Blanquilla Island, Venezuela. Her seven crew survived. she was on a voyage from Cardiff, Glamorgan to La Guayra, Venezuela.

== 4 October ==
List of shipwrecks: 4 October 1890
Ship	State	Description
Elf	United Kingdom	The steam launch was driven ashore and wrecked in Wemyss Bay.
Freital	Germany	The barque foundered in the North Sea. Her ten crew were rescued by the steamship Hesleyside (United Kingdom). Freitag was presumed to have subsequently foundered. She was on a voyage from Stettin to Hartlepool, County Durham, United Kingdom.
Sway	United Kingdom	The ketch was wrcked in the North Sea. Her crew were rescued by the lugger Forbin (France).

== 5 October ==
List of shipwrecks: 5 October 1890
Ship	State	Description
Albertha Romeliagh	Netherlands	The schooner was driven ashore at "Mane", Denmark with the loss of all hands.
Gerhardina	Germany	The brigantine was driven ashore on Sylt in a capsized condition.
Hanna	Norway	The barque sprang a leak off the Magdalen Islands, Nova Scotia, Dominion of Canada and was beached on Cole's Reef. She was on a voyage from Buctouche, New Brunswick, Dominion of Canada to Liverpool, Lancashire, United Kingdom. She was later refloated and taken in to Pictou, Nova Scotia.
Unnamed	Flag unknown	The barque collided with the steamship Ouse (United Kingdom) and sank in the North Sea 70 nautical miles (130 km) off Vlissingen, Zeeland, Netherlands with the loss of all hands.

== 6 October ==
List of shipwrecks: 6 October 1890
Ship	State	Description
Alethea	United Kingdom	The steamship ran aground in the River Thames at the Coalhouse Fort, Essex. She was refloated.
Dixon	United States	The steamship was driven ashore in Chicago Bay.
Mary Jane	United Kingdom	The schooner was wrecked at Cape Tormentine, New Brunswick, Dominion of Canada with the loss of all hands.
Neptun	Flag unknown	The ship was driven ashore and wrecked on Spiekeroog, Germany. She was on a voyage from "Soroko" to Bristol, Gloucestershire, United Kingdom.
Neptun	Sweden	The steamship caught fire at sea. She came ashore on Rügen, Germany. She was on a voyage from Gävle, Sweden to Lübeck, Germany.
Saint Marc	France	The steamship put in to Bastia, Corsica on fire. She was on a voyage from Naples, Italy to Marseille, Bouches-du-Rhône. The fire was extinguished, but she was severely damaged.

== 7 October ==
List of shipwrecks: 7 October 1890
Ship	State	Description
Alamo	United States	The steamship caught fire at New York. She was on a voyage from Galveston, Texas to New York.
Amy	United Kingdom	The schooner was driven ashore at Doel, Belgium. She was on a voyage from Antwerp, Belgium to Newport, Monmouthshire.
Ciudad de Condal	Spain	The steamship caught fire off Liberty Island, New York.
Pickwick	United Kingdom	The steamship ran aground on the Sunk Spit, in the River Humber.
Unnamed	Flag unknown	The ship ran aground on the Tuskar Rock. Her crew survived.

== 8 October ==
List of shipwrecks: 8 October 1890
Ship	State	Description
Carl	Norway	The brig ran aground at Langholz, Germany.
Isis	United Kingdom	The steamship was severely damaged by fire at South Shields, County Durham.
Olaf Trygvason	Sweden	The ship ran aground on the Middelgrunden. She was being towed from Helsingborg to Sundsvall.
Rothesay Nellie	United Kingdom	The steamship foundered off Rothesay, Isle of Bute. Her crew survived. She was on a voyage from Greenock, Renfrewshire to Barmouth, Carnarvonshire.
Saint Kilda	United Kingdom	The steamship ran aground 140 nautical miles (260 km) from Bathurst. She was a total loss.

== 9 October ==
List of shipwrecks: 9 October 1890
Ship	State	Description
Nishnij Novgorod	Denmark	The steamship ran aground on the Middelgrunden. She was on a voyage from Riga, Russia to Antwerp, Belgium.
Oxenholme	United Kingdom	The steamship was driven ashore on Grosse Isle, Quebec, Dominion of Canada. She was later refloated with assistance from Alexina ( Dominion of Canada) and towed in to Quebec City.
Paladin	Germany	The barque was abandoned in the North Sea. She was on a voyage from Stettin to West Hartlepool, County Durham, United Kingdom.
Rio Lima	Portugal	The steamship collided with another vessel and sank off Cabo Carvoeiro. She was on a voyage from Porto to Lisbon.
Wyre	United Kingdom	The steamship caught fire at "Annagasson".
Unnamed	Flag unknown	The brig was wrecked in the Kattegat.

== 10 October ==
List of shipwrecks: 10 October 1890
Ship	State	Description
Elize Schultz	Germany	The barque was damaged in the Atlantic Ocean by an onboard explosion. Two of her crew were killed. She was on a voyage from Cardiff, Glamorgan, United Kingdom to Buenos Aires, Argentina.
Egremont Castle	United Kingdom	The steamship ran aground in the Elbe. She was on a voyage from Odessa, Russia to Hamburg, Germany. She was refloated.

== 11 October ==
List of shipwrecks: 11 October 1890
Ship	State	Description
Alexina	Dominion of Canada	The schooner collided with Oxenholme (United Kingdom) and sank off Gross Isle, Quebec. Her crew were rescued.
Amethyst	United Kingdom	The steamship caught fire at sea. She was on a voyage from Galveston, Texas, United States to the River Mersey.
Carpio	Spain	The steamship ran aground at Shoeburyness, Essex, United Kingdom. She was refloated and taken to the Nore.
Eliza	United States	The 296.51-gross register ton, 109-foot (33.2 m) barque was wrecked without loss of life on Saint Lawrence Island in the Bering Sea during a gale. The steamship Belvedere (United States) rescued her crew of 35 on 19 October.
Jason	United Kingdom	The steamship ran aground in the Clyde at Dumbarton. She was refloated the next day and resumed her voyage.
Melbourne	United Kingdom	The steamship ran aground in the Nieuwe Waterweg at Maassluis, South Holland, Netherlands. She was on a voyage from Odessa, Russia to Rotterdam, South Holland. She was refloated.
Sirena	Norway	The schooner was driven ashore at Hjelmen. She was refloated with the assistance of the steamship Hertha (Norway) and towed in to Aarhus, Denmark.

== 12 October ==
List of shipwrecks: 12 October 1890
Ship	State	Description
Adolphe, and Wellington	France; United Kingdom	The steamships collided in the English Channel and were both severely damaged. Adolphoe was towed in to Dover, Kent and Wellington was towed to London.
Argo	United Kingdom	The steamship ran aground in the River Avon. Her passengers were taken off. She was on a voyage from Dublin to Bristol, Gloucestershire. She was refloated.
Baron Hambro	United Kingdom	The steamship ran aground at Bordeaux, Gironde, France.
City of Rome	United Kingdom	The steamship ran aground at New York, United States. She was on a voyage from Liverpool, Lancashire to New York. She was refloated.
Dartmoor	United Kingdom	The steamship collided with the steamship Cobden (United Kingdom) and foundered in the North Sea 6 nautical miles (11 km) east south east of Flamborough Head, Yorkshire. Her crew were rescued by Cobden. Dartmoor was on a voyage from Ipswich, Suffolk to Newcastle upon Tyne, Northumberland.
Fearnought	United Kingdom	The barque was abandoned in the Atlantic Ocean. Her eighteen crew were rescued by the steamship Engineer (United Kingdom). Fearnought was on a voyage from Saint Johh, New Brunswick, Dominion of Canada to Fleetwood, Lancashire.
Frida	Norway	The steamship was driven ashore on Amrum, Germany. She was on a voyage from Fraserburgh, Aberdeenshire, United Kingdom to Hamburg, Germany.
Guyenne	United Kingdom	The steamship ran aground at Cardiff, Glamorgan, United Kingdom. She was on a voyage from Cardiff to Rocquefort, Seine-Inférieure. She was refloated.
Halling	United Kingdom	The collier, a steamship, collided with another steamship and sank in the River Thames. She was on a voyage from London to Sunderland, County Durham. She was refloated on 15 October.
Josiah Whitehouse'	United States	The schooner collided with another vessel and sank off Nashamina Island. She was on a voyage from New York to Salem, Massachusetts.
Marie Anna	Flag unknown	The brig was driven at Cow Bay, Nova Scotia, Dominion of Canada.
Melmerby	United Kingdom	The barque was driven ashore and wrecked at Merigomish, Nova Scotia with the loss of sixteen of her 23 crew. She was on a voyage from Quebec, Canada to Liverpool, Lancashire, or Greenock, Renfrewshire.
Pioneer, and Queen of the Usk	United Kingdom	The tugs collided in the Bristol Channel off Breaksea Point, Glamorgan. The paddle tug Pioneer sank. Her crew were rescued. The screw tug Queen of the Usk was beached at Abertawe, Glamorgan.
Queen	Norway	The barque was driven ashore and severely damaged near Vadsø. She was on a voyage from Archangelsk, Russia to Plymouth, Devon, United Kingdom.
Sunshine	United Kingdom	The hobbling boat was run into by the brig Henri Evelina (France) at Holyhead, Anglesey. She capsized with the loss of one of her three crew.
Unnamed	Flag unknown	The steamship was driven ashore on Coelleira, Spain and was abandoned by her crew.

== 13 October ==
List of shipwrecks: 13 October 1890
Ship	State	Description
Ayr	United Kingdom	The schooner ran aground on the Catumb Reef, off the coast of Rhode Island, United States. She was on a voyage from Saint John, New Brunswick, Dominion of Canada to New York, United States.
Gefina	Russia	The barque ran aground on the Hittarp Reef, in the Baltic Sea. She was on a voyage from Skellefteå, Sweden to Calais, France. She was refloated and towed in to Helsingør, Denmark
Heimburg	Germany	The steamship ran aground in the Danube 19 nautical miles (35 km) from its mouth. She was refloated on 15 October.
Henry Fisher, and Leona	United Kingdom	The steamships collided in the River Ouse at Goole, Yorkshire. Both vessels were severely damaged. Henry Fisher was on a voyage from Goole to Saint-Malo, Ille-et-Villaine, France. Leona was on a voyage from Goole to Ghent, East Flanders, Belgium.
Isaac	Sweden	The schooner was discovered off Cap Arkona, Germany by the steamship Rügen (Germany). She was towed in to Greifswald, Germany.
Johann	Russia	The schooner was driven ashore at Lysekil, Sweden. Her crew were rescued. She was on a voyage from a Norwegian port to Saint Petersburg.
John F. Warner	United States	John F. Warner The wooden schooner was driven ashore on the coast of Lake Huron near Alpena, Michigan, where she broke in half and sank in 9 feet (2.7 m) of water at 45.050833°N 83.435467°W.
Landskrona	Sweden	The steamship ran aground at Isle Conejero, near O Vicedo, Spain. All on board were rescued by the steamship Cabo Pinas (Spain). Landskrona was on a voyage from Bordeaux, Gironde, France to Lisbon, Portugal. She subsequently broke in two and was a total loss.
Memel	Germany	The barque was driven ashore and wrecked on the Robbenplatte. She was on a voyage from Memel to Southampton, Hampshire, United Kingdom.
Perim	United Kingdom	The steamship collided with the steamship Alonzo (United Kingdom) in the English Channel and was severely damaged. Perim was on a voyage from Antwerp, Belgium to Cardiff, Glamorgan.
St. Pierre	France	The tug collided with the steamship Lady Bertha (United Kingdom) and sank at Le Havre, Seine-Inférieure.
Thyra	Germany	The steamship collided with the steamship Ursula (United Kingdom) and sank in the English Channel off Beachy Head, Sussex, United Kingdom. Her crew were rescued by Ursula. Thyra was on a voyage from St. Ubes, Portugal to Hamburg.
Willy	Sweden	The schooner was driven ashore at "Nonnewitz on Rügen", Germany.

== 14 October ==
List of shipwrecks: 14 October 1890
Ship	State	Description
Alonso	United Kingdom	The steamship ran aground in the Nieuwe Waterweg new Maassluis, South Holland, Netherlands. She was on a voyage from Brăila, Romania to Rotterdam, South Holland. She was refloated with assistance.
A. S. Piper	United States	While her crew was ashore, the steam tug caught fire during the evening while moored to a wharf at Sturgeon Bay, Wisconsin. The tug Mosher (United States) pulled her away from the wharf, but the fire burned out of control and destroyed A. S. Piper, which drifted ashore and became a total loss. Her wreck sank near the channel at the head of Sturgeon Bay and was documented as lying at 44°50.079′N 087°22.915′W in April 1904.
Cleopatra	United Kingdom	The barque was wrecked near Richmond Bay, Prince Edward Island, Dominion of Canada. She was on a voyage from Miramichi, New Brunswick, Dominion of Canada to Penarth, Glamorgan.
Drie Gebruders	Netherlands	The ship collided with the steamship Stad Amsterdam (Netherlands) and sank in the Scheldt at Austrwueel, Belgium. Drie Gebruders was on a voyage from Antwerp, Belgium to Groningen.
Esther and Ann	United Kingdom	The schooner collided with the schooner Yucatan (United Kingdom) and sank in the River Mersey. Her crew got aboard Yucatan.
Fanny	United Kingdom	The smack foundered off the Isle of Arran with the loss of two of her three crew. The survivor was rescued by the smack Rapid (United Kingdom).
Grimsby, and Severn	United Kingdom	The steamships collided at Hull, Yorkshire. Both vessels were severely damaged.
Kingscote	United Kingdom	The steamship collided with the steamship River Ettrick (United Kingdom) and sank at Newcastle upon Tyne, Northumberland. She was refloated.
Loveid	Norway	The barque collided with the steamship Heraclides in the River Mersey and was severely damaged. Loveid was on a voyage from a port in Nova Scotia, Dominion of Canada to Liverpool, Lancashire, United Kingdom.
Marie	Norway	The barque was driven ashore and wrecked in Aspey Bay, Nova Scotia. Her crew were rescued. She was on a voyage from Barrow-in-Furness, Lancashire to Charlotte Town, Prince Edward Island.
Puika	Russia	The schooner ran aground on the Stapelbotten, in the Baltic Sea.
Quickstep	United Kingdom	The steamship was driven ashore at the mouth of the Seine. She was on a voyage from Cardiff, Glamorgan to Rouen, Seine-Inférieure, France. She was refloated with assistance.
Soerabaja	Netherlands	The steamship ran aground in the Nieuwe Waterweg at Maassluis. She was on a voyage from a port in Java, Netherlands East Indies to Rotterdam. She was refloated the next day.
Thora	Germany	The barque was wrecked by an onboard explosion at Cardiff.

== 15 October ==
List of shipwrecks: 15 October 1890
Ship	State	Description
Amur	United Kingdom	The steamship ran aground at Falsterbo, Sweden. She was on a voyage from Libau, Russia to London. She was refloated and taken in to Helsingør, Denmark in a leaky condition.
Blenheim	United Kingdom	The steamship was driven ashore at San Rafael, Uruguay. She was on a voyage from Liverpool, Lancashire to Buenos Aires, Argentina. She was refloated and taken in to Buenos Aires in a severely damaged condition.
Galatz	Romania	The lighter ran aground in the Danube upstream of Sistov.
Hafis Osman	Ottoman Empire	The caïque ran aground in the Danube near Sistov.
Saint Louis	France	The lugger collided with the barque Europa (United Kingdom) and sank in the English Channel 10 nautical miles (19 km) off Gravelines, Nord. Her crew were rescued.
Thomas	United Kingdom	The Mersey flat was driven ashore in the Hilbre Islands, Cheshire. Her crew were rescued.
Villa de Llaniez	Spain	The barque foundered in Liverpool Bay with the loss of all thirteen people on board. She was on a voyage from the River Mersey to "Laguna, Mexico".
W. H. Corsar	United Kingdom	The ship was driven ashore between Egremont and New Brighton, Cheshire. She was on a voyage from Saint John, New Brunswick, Dominion of Canada to Liverpool, Lancashire. She was refloated with assistance. She was refloated with the assistance of two tugs.
Unnamed	Netherlands	The fishing vessel was discovered derelict in the North Sea. The fishing smacks St. George and Victory (both United Kingdom) each put two men aboard. Presumed subsequently foundered with the loss of all hands.

== 16 October ==
List of shipwrecks: 16 October 1890
Ship	State	Description
Auckland	United Kingdom	The steamship was driven ashore at Great Yarmouth, Norfolk. She was on a voyage from Caen, Calvados, France to Newcastle upon Tyne, Northumberland.
Bradley, and Hero	United Kingdom	The steamships collided in the River Tees. Bradley was driven ashore, but floated the next day. Hero was severely damaged.
Carl	Sweden	The ship was driven ashore at Karlskrona. She was on a voyage from Piteå to Marseille, Bouches-du-Rhône, France.
Corsair	United Kingdom	The ship was driven ashore in the River Mersey.
Druide	France	The brigantine ran aground and capsized in the Bristol Channel off Cardiff, Glamorgan, United Kingdom. Her crew were rescued by the tug Lady Salisbury (United Kingdom). Druide floated off and was beached at Penarth, Glamorgan.
Fleetwing, or Lapwing	United Kingdom	The yacht was wrecked in Ballycastle Bay.
Kathleen	United Kingdom	The steamship ran aground in the Dardanelles. She was refloated the next day.
Orestes	United Kingdom	The steamship ran aground in the River Thames at Coalhouse Fort, Essex. She was on a voyage from Singapore to London. She was refloated and taken in to Gravesend, Kent.
Patrick	United Kingdom	The pilot cutter was wrecked at Kilcoher, County Clare.
William Skillinge	Flag unknown	The barque was driven ashore near the Sommaro Lighthouse, Grand Duchy of Finland.
Unnamed	Netherlands	The fishing smack collided with the barque Commerce (Norway) and sank in the North Sea. Her crew survived.
Unnamed	Flag unknown	The schooner was driven ashore at Peel, Isle of Man. Her crew were rescued by the Peel Lifeboat.

== 17 October ==
List of shipwrecks: 17 October 1890
Ship	State	Description
Algerie	France	The steamship put in to Bastia, Corsica on fire. She was on a voyage from Naples, Italy to Marseille, Bouches-du-Rhône. The fire was extinguished.
Astoria	United Kingdom	The ship was driven ashore near Le Touquet, Pas-de-Calais, France. She was on a voyage from Saigon, French Indo-China to Hamburg, Germany. She was refloated the next day and towed in to Gravesend, Kent.
Brooklands	United Kingdom	The steamship was driven ashore at Dagerort, Russia. She was later refloated. She was refloated on 19 October and taken in to Reval, Russia.
Cardiganshire	United Kingdom	The steamship ran aground at Yokohama, Japan. She was refloated and taken in to Yokohama.
Cosmopolite	United Kingdom	The lugger collided with the schooner Seaman (United Kingdom) and sank off Dungeness, Kent. Her crew were rescued.
Ephratah	United Kingdom	The brig collided with the schooner Our Nellie (United Kingdom) off Deal, Kent and was severely damaged. Ephratah was on a voyage from Ipswich, Suffolk to Demerara, British Guiana. She was towed in to Dover, Kent.
James A. Garfield	United States	The tug collided with another tug at New York and sank with the loss of six lives.
Lizzie C. Troop	United Kingdom	The ship was wrecked in the Loochoo Islands, Japan with the loss of twelve lives. She was on a voyage from Nagasaki, Japan to the Puget Sound.
Louisa Smith	United States	The schooner foundered off the coast of New England. Her crew were rescued by a fishing schooner.
Margaret Ellen	United Kingdom	The schooner collided with the schooner Trial (United Kingdom) at Maryport, Cumberland and was severely damaged.
Tamarind	Norway	The steamship was driven ashore. She was on a voyage from Skutskär, Sweden to London, United Kingdom. She was refloated and put in to Oskarshamn, Sweden in a leaky condition.
Victor	Sweden	The barque was driven ashore and wrecked at Shemogue, New Brunswick, Dominion of Canada.
105S	Regia Marina	The torpedo boat foundered in the Piombino Channel off the coast of Italy during a storm with the loss of all eighteen crew.
Unnamed	Flag unknown	The fishing lugger collided with the schooner Sinman (United Kingdom) and sank off Dungeness, Kent. Her crew were rescued.
Two unnamed vessels	United States	The schooners were driven ashore near Chatham, Massachusetts. Their crews were rescued by lifeboats.

== 18 October ==
List of shipwrecks: 18 October 1890
Ship	State	Description
Gairloch	United Kingdom	The steamship ran aground in the Clyde at Greenock, Renfrewshire. She was on a voyage from Greenock to Constantinople, Ottoman Empire. She was refloated and resumed her voyage.
Godiva	United Kingdom	The steamship caught fire at Calcutta, India.
Jacmel	Haitian Navy	The corvette collided with another vessel and sank off Cap-Haïtien.
Vestervig	Denmark	The schooner was driven ashore 5 nautical miles (9.3 km) west of Dunkerque, Nord, France. Her crew were rescued. She was on a voyage from Dram, Norway to Saint-Brieuc, Côtes du Nord, France.
Unnamed	Norway	The barque capsized and sank in the North Sea 20 nautical miles (37 km) off Flamborough Head, Yorkshire, United Kingdom. Her crew were rescued by a fishing boat.

== 19 October ==
List of shipwrecks: 19 October 1890
Ship	State	Description
Alberta	United Kingdom	The 3,168-gross register ton cargo steamship, laden with coal on a voyage from Japan to Melbourne, Victoria, Australia, ran aground on Sutherland Reef south of Fingal Head Light, New South Wales. Her crew of 36 reached Tweed Heads in the ship's lifeboats. She was on a voyage from Hong Kong to Melbourne.
Ardlethan	United Kingdom	The steamship collided with El Dorado at South Shields, County Durham and was severely damaged. Ardlethan was on a voyage from South Shields to Naples, Italy.
Ashfield	United Kingdom	The steamship ran aground at Cardiff, Glamorgan. She was refloated with assistance and resumed her voyage.
Agostino C.	Austria-Hungary	The barque collided with the steamship Vulcan (Germany) and sank off Cape Trafalgar, Spain. Her crew were rescued by Vulcan. Agostino C. was on a voyage from Cádiz, Spain to Fiume.
Dunrobin	United Kingdom	The ship was driven ashore at Brouwershaven, Zeeland, Netherlands. Her crew were rescued.
Elisa	Germany	The brig was driven ashore at Nieuwpoort, West Flanders, Belgium with the loss of all but her captain.
F. H. von Lindern	Netherlands	The ship was driven ashore at Zandvoort, North Holland. Her crew survived. She was on a voyage from Java, Netherlands East Indies to Amsterdam, North Holland.
SMS Friedrich Carl	Imperial German Navy	The ironclad ran aground on the Bramble Bank, in the Solent. She was refloated.
Genesta	United Kingdom	The fishing smack was driven ashore near Withernsea, Yorkshire with the loss of her captain. Survivors were rescued by rocket apparatus.
Hebe	Flag unknown	The steamship ran aground at Pori, Grand Duchy of Finland.
Helen Otto	United Kingdom	The steamship was driven ashore on Tenedos, Ottoman Empire. She was refloated.
Ida	United Kingdom	The schooner was driven ashore and wrecked 10 nautical miles (19 km) east of Calais, France. Her five crew were rescued by rocket apparatus. She was on a voyage from Seaham, County Durham to Margate, Kent.
Immanuel	Denmark	The schooner was driven ashore on Öland, Sweden.
Lero	United Kingdom	The steamship ran aground at Sunderland, County Durham. She was on a voyage from Hamburg, Germany to Philadelphia, Pennsylvania, United States. She was refloated and found to be severely leaky. She was placed under repair.
Michael Jelsen	Germany	The steamship ran aground at the mouth of the Pasig River, Spanish East Indies. She was refloated and resumed her voyage.
Napoleon III	United Kingdom	The steamship was driven ashore at Glace Bay, Newfoundland Colony. All on board were rescued.
Ninian Stuart	United Kingdom	The steamship ran aground in the Danube 39 nautical miles (72 km) from its mouth. She was refloated and taken in to Sulina, Romania.
Preston	United Kingdom	The steamship ran aground in the Scheldt near Antwerp, Belgium. She was on a voyage from Antwerp to Cardiff, Glamorgan.
Restless Wave	United Kingdom	The steam trawler foundered off the Isle of May, Fife. Her seven crew were rescued by Fergus Ferguson ( Royal National Lifeboat Institution).

== 20 October ==
List of shipwrecks: 20 October 1890
Ship	State	Description
Achilles	United Kingdom	The steamship ran aground on the Shipwash Sand, in the North Sea off the coast of Suffolk. She was refloated with assistance from the tug Harwich (United Kingdom) and the Harwich Lifeboat Duke of Northumberland and No. 3 (both Royal National Lifeboat Institution) and towed in to Harwich, Essex.Achilles was on a voyage from Riga, Russia to London. Harwich towed her to London.
Bernardo, Castanes, Rossini, and Vladimir	Romania	The lighters ran aground in the Danube near Widin.
Charlotte A. Littlefield	Norway	The barque foundered in the North Sea. Her crew were rescued by the smack Her Majesty (United Kingdom). Charlotte A. Littlefield was on a voyage from Grangemouth, Stirlingshire, United Kingdom to Buenos Aires, Argentina.
Ema	Romania	The lighter ran aground in the Danube at "Nos Aili". She was being towed from Corabia to Brăila. She was refloated and taken in to Brăila.
Emma	Germany	The tug sank in the Elbe.
Erisos	Romania	The lighter ran aground in the Danube at "Muncano". She was being towed from "Giurgero" to Brăila. She was refloated with assistance.
Favour	Norway	The brig was driven ashore and wrecked at Vrouwenpolder, Zeeland, Netherlands. Her crew were rescued.
Josefa	Sweden	The barque ran aground on the Goodwin Sands, Kent, United Kingdom. She was on a voyage from Skellefteå to Dieppe, Seine-Inférieure, France. She was refloated with assistance and taken in to The Downs in a leaky condition.
Melanie	United Kingdom	The brig was abandoned in the North Sea 30 nautical miles (56 km) off Terschelling, Friesland, Netherlands. Her crew were rescued by the fishing trawler Serica (United Kingdom). Melanie was on a voyage from Newport, Monmouthshire to Christiania, Norway.
Mississippi	United Kingdom	The smack collided with the barque Firth of Stronsa (United Kingdom) in the North Sea and was severely damaged. She was towed in to Great Yarmouth, Norfolk.
Ulf	Norway	The steamship was driven ashore at "Sikvik", Sweden.
Unnamed	France	The lighter was sunk by the steamship Flatchet (France) at Bordeaux, Gironde.

== 21 October ==
List of shipwrecks: 21 October 1890
Ship	State	Description
Annie Young	Flag unknown	The steamship was destroyed by fire in Lake Huron near Sarnia, Ontario, Dominion of Canada with the loss of seven lives. She was on a voyage from Gladstone, Michigan to Buffalo, New York, United States.
Banda	Germany	The steamship ran aground in the Elbe at Lühe. She was on a voyage from Calcutta, India to Hamburg. She was refloated on 22 October and taken in to Hamburg.
Brodrene	Denmark	The schooner was abandoned at sea. Her crew were rescued by the steamship Bergenhuus (Denmark). Brodrene was on a voyage from Härnösand, Sweden to Lübeck, Germany.
Caroline	United Kingdom	The schooner was wrecked at Kongshavn, Norway. Her crew were rescued. She was on a voyage from Copenhagen, Denmark to a French port.
Croesus	United Kingdom	The steamship ran aground in the River Tees. she was on a voyage from Bilbao, Spain to Stockton-on-Tees, Yorkshire.
Eastern	United Kingdom	The steamship was driven ashore at "Laronce", Seine-Inférieure, France.
Rainbow	United States	The steamship was destroyed by fire at Cincinnati, Ohio.
Slinken	Norway	The barque was driven ashore at Shediac, New Brunswick, Dominion of Canada.
Troutbeck	United Kingdom	The steamship was damaged at "Noften", Russia with the loss of five lives. She was on a voyage from Narva, Russia to London. She subsequently became a wreck.

== 22 October ==
List of shipwrecks: 22 October 1890
Ship	State	Description
Glenavna Park, and Sarah Bell	United Kingdom	The barquentine Glenavna and the barque Sarah Bell collided in the Atlantic Ocean (37°16′N 33°28′W) and both foundered. Their crews were rescued by the barque Racehorse (Norway). Glenavna Park was on a voyage from the Rio Grande do Sul to Liverpool, Lancashire. Sarah Bell was on a voyage from Cardiff, Glamorgan to Valparaíso, Chile.

== 23 October ==
List of shipwrecks: 23 October 1890
Ship	State	Description
Adjutor	Norway	The schooner collided with a barque and was abandoned by her crew. She was on a voyage from Memel, Germany to Leith, Lothian, United Kingdom. She was towed in to Gothenburg, Sweden by the steamship Regalia (United Kingdom).
Alexander Swift	United States	The steamship broke in two near Glenwood, Pennsylvania. All on board were rescued.
Carl	Sweden	The schooner was driven ashore and wrecked at Umeå.
Freya	Norway	The barque ran aground on the Holm Sand, in the North Sea off the coast of Suffolk, United Kingdom. She was on a voyage from Drontheim to Quebec, Dominion of Canada. She was refloated and assisted in to Great Yarmouth, Norfolk, United Kingdom.
Hungaria	United Kingdom	The steamship was driven ashore on Tenedos, Ottoman Empire. She was refloated and resumed her voyage.
Orient, and Ostsee	Norway; Germany	The barques collided at sea. Both vessels put in to Gothenburg in a severely damaged condition. Orient was on a voyage from Härnösand, Sweden to Northfleet, Kent, United Kingdom. Ostsee was on a voyage from South Shields, County Durham, United Kingdom to Stettin.
Roumanian	Romania	The lighter ran aground in the Danube at Brăila.

== 24 October ==
List of shipwrecks: 24 October 1890
Ship	State	Description
Abeona	United Kingdom	The steamship ran aground on the Horgrund Reef, off the coast of Sweden. She was on a voyage from Sundsvall, Sweden to West Hartlepool, County Durham.
Beatrice	United Kingdom	The passenger boat was run into by the steamship Walker (United Kingdom) at South SHields, County Durham and was beached.
Catarina	United States	The steam yacht struck a rock and sank in Matinecock Bay, Long Island. New York. All 30 people on board survived.
Cygnet	United Kingdom	The steamship collided with another vessel and was beached in the River Thames. She was refloated on 26 October.
Duke	United Kingdom	The steamship ran aground at Fleetwood, Lancashire. She was on a voyage from Fleetwood to Ardrossan, Ayrshire.
Ernest, and Murton	United Kingdom	The schooner Ernest collided with the steamship Murton and sank in the North Sea with the loss of three of her seven crew. Ernest was on a voyage from "Urnbo" to Leith, Lothian. Murton was beached at Hartlepool, County Durham. She was on a voyage from Warkworth, Northumberland to Devonport, Devon.
Euterpe	Flag unknown	The ship ran aground in the Elbe at Lühe, Germany. She was on a voyage from Hamburg, Germany to Sydney, New South Wales. She was refloated and taken in to Brunshausen, Germany.
Il Guerriere	Italy	The schooner was wrecked at Alghero.
Jupiter	Germany	The steamship collided with the steamship Cyprus (United Kingdom) in the North Sea and was severely damaged. Jupiter was on a voyage from Sunderland, County Durham to Neufahrwassar. She put back to Sunderland.
Ouse Hopper No.3	United Kingdom	The hopper barge ran aground on Redcar Rocks, off the coast of Yorkshire. She was on a voyage from Goole, Yorkshire to the River Tees. She was refloated.
Rosenborg	Denmark	The steamship ran aground at Amack. She was on a voyage from Härnösand, Sweden to Le Havre, Seine-Inférieure, France. She was refloated with assistance and resumed her voyage.
Vestalinden	Norway	The ship was abandoned in the Baltic Sea. Her crew survived. She was on a voyage from Sandviken, Sweden to Glückstadt, Germany. She was subsequently taken in to Mariehamn, Grand Duchy of Finland in a derelict condition.
William and Sarah Ann	United Kingdom	The ship ran aground on the Warham Sands, off the north coast of Norfolk. She was refloated with assistance.

== 25 October ==
List of shipwrecks: 25 October 1890
Ship	State	Description
Albanian	United Kingdom	The steamship was driven ashore at Nasby, Öland, Sweden. She was on a voyage from Hull, Yorkshire to Stockholm, Sweden.
Calliope	Romania	The lighter ran aground in the Danube at "Tsai". She was on a voygage from Turnu Măgurele to Brăila. She was refloated and found to be leaky.
Evelina	United Kingdom	The schooner was abandoned in the North Sea off Flamborough Head, Yorkshire, being in a sinking condition. Her crew survived. She was on a voyage from Caernarfon to Sunderland, County Durham.
Felix Marie	France	The schooner ran aground on the Four Reefs. Her crew were rescued. She was on a voyage from Cardiff, Glamorgan, United Kingdom to Nantes, Loire-Inférieure. She sank the next day.
Jalo	Russia	The ship was driven ashore and wrecked at "Kleinfischers Nerwoe".
Kristina Sofia	Sweden	The barque ran aground and sank at Bogskär, Grand Duchy of Finland with the loss of three of her crew. She was on a voyage from Hull, Yorkshire to Sundsvall.

== 26 October ==
List of shipwrecks: 26 October 1890
Ship	State	Description
Frederick Stonard	United Kingdom	The schooner was abandoned in the Atlantic Ocean. Her crew were rescued by the steamship Hispania (Flag unknown). Frederick Stonard was on a voyage from Newcastle upon Tyne, Northumberland to Cork.
Harmonie	Norway	The ship sprang a leak and foundered in the North Sea (56°15′N 4°06′E). Her crew were rescued by the smack Mary Boyes (United Kingdom). They were subsequently transferred to the steam trawler Onward (United Kingdom). Harmonie was on a voyage from London, United Kingdom to Farsund.
Industrie	Germany	The smack was driven ashore at Buckie, Aberdeenshire, United Kingdom. Her crew were rescued by rocket apparatus.
Resolution	Spain	The brigantine was run into by SMS Kaiser (Imperial German Navy) at Gibraltar and was damaged.
Unnamed	Flag unknown	The ship ran aground on Plateau No.4, off Guadeloupe.

== 27 October ==
List of shipwrecks: 27 October 1890
Ship	State	Description
Acme	United Kingdom	The steamship was driven ashore at Kertch, Russia. She was refloated on 31 October.
Beethoven	United Kingdom	The steamship caught fire at Cardiff, Glamorgan. The fire was extinguished.
Cassandra	Germany	The steamship was driven ashore at "Faraman". She was on a voyage from the Lagos Colony to Marseille, Bouches-du-Rhône, France. She was refloated and resumed her voyage, arriving at Marseille on 27 October.
Chispa	Spain	The steamship was driven ashore at Aparri, Spanish East Indies during a cyclone. She was refloated on 21 November.
Countess	United Kingdom	The fishing trawler caught fire at Ringsend, County Dublin and was scuttled.
Majella	United States	The steam lighter was driven ashore at Providence, Rhode Island.
Mary Culmer	United Kingdom	The schooner was assisted in to Portsmouth, New Hampshire, United States in a waterlogged condition. She was on a voyage from the Turks Islands to Halifax, Nova Scotia, Dominion of Canada.
Molego	Flag unknown	The steamship caught fire and sank at Caledonia, Ontario, Dominion of Canada.
New Onward	United Kingdom	The herring boat was driven ashore and wrecked at Fraserburgh, Aberdeenshire.

== 28 October ==
List of shipwrecks: 28 October 1890
Ship	State	Description
Andacia	Norway	The barque was towed in to Stockholm, Sweden in a waterlogged condition .
Benton	Flag unknown	The 77-ton schooner survived hitting the Pollard Rock in the Seven Stones Reef, made it to Falmouth, Cornwall, United Kingdom, full of water and with her cargo of china clay intact.
Bessie Taylor, and H. C.	United Kingdom	The Thames barges were run into by the steamship Fatfield (United Kingdom) in the River Thames downstream of Coalhouse Fort, Essex. Bessie Taylor was severely damaged and was beached. H. C. sank.
Capulet	United Kingdom	The steamship was driven ashore in the River Thames at Cuckles Point, London.
Ceredig	United Kingdom	The brig was abandoned in the Atlantic Ocean. Her crew were rescued by the steamship Waterloo (United Kingdom). Ceredig was on a voyage from London to Trinidad.
F Mewin'	United States	The schooner foundered in the Atlantic Ocean. She was on a voyage from Frankfort, Maine to New York.
Hazelbank	United Kingdom	The full-rigged ship was wrecked on the Goodwin Sands, Kent. She was on a voyage from a port in the Washington Territory to Hull, Yorkshire.
Mackinaw	United States	The steamship was destroyed by fire at Black River, Michigan.
Minna	United Kingdom	The ship was abandoned in the North Sea. Her crew survived. She was on a voyage from Grangemouth, Stirlingshire to Stralsund, Noray.
Robert Morrison	United Kingdom	The hulk was abandoned by her crew. They were rescued by the tug Scotia (United Kingdom), which was towing Robert Morrison from London to Le Havre, Seine-Inférieure, France. The two vessels put in to Dover, Kent.
Vulcan	Germany	The steamship collided with the steamship Salamanca (United Kingdom) and sank in the River Thames. Vulcan was on a voyage from Zante, Greece to London. She was refloated on 2 November.

== 29 October ==
List of shipwrecks: October 1890
Ship	State	Description
Almath Elizabeth	Germany	The ship was driven ashore at Gävle, Sweden. Her crew were rescued.
Atalanta	United Kingdom	The steamship ran aground on the Yantlet Sand, off the north coast of Kent. She was refloated and resumed her voyage.
Earn	United Kingdom	The barque was wrecked on Providence Island, Seychelles. Her crew were rescued. She was on a voyage from the Comoros Islands to Mauritius.
Erik Behrendsen	Germany	The ship was wrecked near Wenningstaedt, Sylt with the loss of three of her four crew. She was on a voyage from Dundee, Forfarshire, United Kingdom to Hamburg.
Eugenie	Flag unknown	The ship was driven ashore and wrecked in Jones Inlet, New York, United States.
Glenisla	United Kingdom	The steamship caught fire at Saint Petersburg, Russia. The fire was extinguished.
Jessie MacPherson, and an unnamed vessel	United Kingdom	The fishing boat Jessie MacPherson collided with another vessel in the North Sea and was abandoned by her crew. The other vessel sank with the loss of all hands.
Lady Alice Kenlis	United Kingdom	The steamship was run into by the steamship Vril at Maryport, Cumberland and was severely damaged.
Lady Wodehouse	United Kingdom	The steamship ran aground in the River Liffey. She was refloated.
Nile	United Kingdom	The full-rigged ship ran aground on the Cross Sands, in the North Sea off Great Yarmouth. She was on a voyage from Calcutta, India to Hull, Yorkshire. She was refloated with assistance on 31 October and taken in tow for Hull.
Plymouth Rock	United Kingdom	The barque was abandoned in the North Sea 40 nautical miles (74 km) off Great Yarmouth, Norfolk. Her crew were rescued by a fishing boat. She was on a voyage from Plymouth, Devon to Fredrikstad, Norway.
State of Washington	United States	The steamship struck a rock in Chuckanut Bay and became waterlogged.
Vectis	United Kingdom	The steamship was driven ashore in the Dardanelles. She was refloated on 31 October.
Yorkshireman	United Kingdom	The steamship sank at Hull, Yorkshire. She was refloated.
Amrum Lifeboat	Germany	The lifeboat capsized off Sylt whilst going to the aid of Erik Behrendsen (Germany) with the loss of all eleven of her crew.
Unnamed	United Kingdom	The tug collided with another vessel and was beached at Lamlash, Isle of Arran, Argyllshire.

== 30 October ==
List of shipwrecks: 30 October 1890
Ship	State	Description
Astracan	Norway	The barque was driven ashore at Falkenberg, Sweden. Her crew were rescued. She was on a voyage from a port in the Grand Duchy of Finland to London, United Kingdom.
Brilliant	Germany	The steamship ran aground at Bremerhaven. She was refloated with the assistance of two steamships.
Cornelius Hargreaves, and Vizcaya	United States; Spain	The schooner Cornelius Hargreaves collided with the steamship Vizcaya 6 nautical miles (11 km) off Barnegat Lighthouse, New Jersey, United States. Both vessels sank within five minutes. Ninety lives were lost. Vizcaya was on a voyage from New York to Havana, Captaincy General of Cuba. The schooner's crew survived. She was on a voyage from Philadelphia, Pennsylvania to Fall River, Massachusetts.
Marta	United Kingdom	The schooner ran aground and sank at "Lerhamn".

== 31 October ==
List of shipwrecks: 31 October 1890
Ship	State	Description
Banca	United Kingdom	The barque was driven ashore at Bahia, Brazil. She was on a voyage from Glasgow, Renfrewshire to a port in New Zealand. She was refloated and taken in to Bahia.
Fannie C	United Kingdom	The schooner caught fire in the English Channel and was beached at Chesil Cove, Dorset.
Glencairn	United Kingdom	The ship was driven ashore in Kingsgate Bay, Kent. She was on a voyage from South Shields, County Durham to San Francisco, California, United States. She was refloated with assistance from the Coastguard and resumed her voyage.
Granada'	United States	The barquentine foundered in the Atlantic Ocean. She was on a voyage from Philadelphia, Pennsylvania to Bermuda.
Haytien Republic	United States	The steamship was driven ashore at Port Hudson, Washington. She was refloated the next day and taken in to Port Townsend, Washington.
Hoffnung	Germany	The schooner ran aground on the Nolleplaat, off the Dutch coast. She was refloated and resumed her voyage.
Humboldt	Flag unknown	The steamship struck a rock at San Francisco and was damaged.
Kronborg	Denmark	The steamship ran aground at "Schardynkil", Zeeland, Netherlands. She was refloated and resumed her voyage.
Leopoldshall	Germany	The schooner was driven ashore in the Nieuw Diep. She was on a voyage from New York, United States to Hamburg, Germany. She was refloated with assistance the next day and found to be severely leaky.
Polymnia	Germany	The full-rigged ship ran aground in the Hooghly River. She was on a voyage from Hamburg to Calcutta, India. She was refloated on 1 November.
Richardine	United Kingdom	The schooner was wrecked on Sylt, Germany with the loss of two of her crew.
Robert	Germany	The schooner was driven ashore at Bondicar, Northumberland, United Kingdom. Her crew were rescued.
Rothesay	United Kingdom	The steamship struck a rock off Matamada, Ceylon and broke in two. The stern section sank. She was on a voyage from Cardiff, Glamorgan to Batavia, Netherlands East Indies.
Speed	Norway	The barque was driven ashore and wrecked in Skälderviken, Sweden. She was on a voyage from Härnösand, Sweden to Tayport, Fife, United Kingdom.
Svanhilde	Norway	The barque was driven ashore and wrecked at Thisted, Denmark. She was on a voyage from London, United Kingdomf to Arendal.
Taul Marty	Sweden	The schooner capsized. Her crew were rescued by the steamship Loch Ness (United Kingdom.
Tunis	United Kingdom	The steamship ran agroud in the River Ouse at Goole, Yorkshire. She was on a voyage from Galaţi, Romania to Goole. She was refloated with the assistance of a number of tugs and taken in to Goole.
Ville de Brest	France	The steamship sank at Marseille, Bouches-du-Rhône. Her crew were rescued. She was on a voyage from Susa, Ottoman Tripolitania to Marseille.

== Unknown date ==
List of shipwrecks: Unknown date in October 1890
Ship	State	Description
Algeria	Dominion of Canada	The barque was wrecked at Cape Dolphin, Nova Scotia. Her crew were rescued. She was on a voyage from Belfast, County Antrim to Sydney, Nova Scotia.
Allan	Russia	The schooner was lost at sea. Her crew were rescued by Helen Newton (United Kingdom).
Anita	Italy	The barque was abandoned in the Atlantic Ocean. Her crew were rescued.
Castle Rising	United Kingdom	The steamship was wrecked on Svenska Bjorn, off Öland, Sweden before 24 October. She was on a voyage from Stockholm, Sweden to King's Lynn, Norfolk. She broke in two on 27 October. The bow section sank, the stern section came ashore. It subsequently floated off, drove out to sea and was presumed to have foundered.
Baldur	Denmark	The schooner collided with another vessel and foundered. She was on a voyage from Dunkerque, Nord, France to Gothenburg, Sweden.
County of Haddington	United Kingdom	The ship ran aground in the Hooghly River. She was refloated on 31 October.
Dinah	United Kingdom	The smack was driven ashore at Rhosneigr, Anglesey. Her eight crew were rescued by the Rhosneigr Lifeboat. She was later refloated.
Dovre	Norway	The brig was abandoned in the Atlantic Ocean before 5 October. Her crew were rescued. Dovre was on a voyage from Liverpool, Lancashire, United Kingdom to Halifax, Nova Scotia, Dominion of Canada. She was later towed in to Saint John's, Newfoundland Colony by the steamship Kite (United Kingdom).
Drie Gebroeders	Netherlands	The ship collided with the steamship Stad Amsterdam (Netherlands and sank in the Scheldt off Austruweel, Belgium. Drie Gebroeders was on a voyage from Antwerp, Belgium to Groningen.
Dunelm	United Kingdom	The steamship ran aground on the Shipwash Sand. She was refloated with assistance from the tug Harwich (United Kingdom).
Elisa	France	The ship was abandoned in the Atlantic Ocean. She was towed in to Saint-Pierre, Saint Pierre and Miquelon on 26 October by Berthe Emilie (France).
George Milliard	United States	The schooner was wrecked at Locke Port, Nova Scotia.
Hazard	Flag unknown	The schooner was wrecked on the Borkum Reef before 6 October.
Hebe	Flag unknown	The ship was abandoned in the North Sea before 7 October.
Kaiser Wilhelm II	Germany	The steamship was driven ashore near "Cappalin". Her crew were rescued. She was refloated on 22 October.
Lansdown	United Kingdom	The vessel left Hakodate, Japan on 12 October, with sulphur for New York. Supposed lost, during a typhoon, in the China Sea along with the crew of thirty.
Mabel	United Kingdom	The barque was driven ashore in the Ashepoo River, South Carolina, United States. She was on a voyage from Coosaw Island, South Carolina to Swansea, Glamorgan. She was refloated and resumed her voyage.
Mancora'	Peru	The barque was lost off Gorgona Island, Colombua. She was on a voyage from Payta to Colombian ports.
Maria Bomba	Italy	The barque was abandoned in the Grand Banks of Newfoundland. Her crew were rescued by Pierre Antoine (France). Maria Bomba was on a voyage from Alicante, Spain to New York.
Marie Heyn	Germany	The barque was driven ashore. She was refloated and put in to Kristiansand, Norway in a leaky condition.
Milnerby	United Kingdom	The barque was wrecked at Merigomish, Nova Scotia with the loss of ten of her crew.
Oregon	Flag unknown	The steamship ran aground at Quebec and sprang a leak.
Peeress	United Kingdom	The steamship ran aground in the Nieuwe Waterweg at Maassluis, South Holland, Netherlands. She was refloated.
Querreiro	Flag unknown	The ship was lost. She was on a voyage from Fiume, Austria-Hungary to Cette, Hérault, France.
Ranee	United Kingdom	The barque caught fire at Dunedin, New Zealand. She was scuttled. She was later refloated.
Risoluto B.'	Italy	The ship was lost on the coast of Sardinia on or about 17 October.
Rosenborg	Flag unknown	The steamship ran aground off Copenhagen, Denmark. She was later refloated and resumed her voyage.
Rudolph	Germany	The steamship ran aground near Leba.
Stella	Norway	The barque was abandoned in the Atlantic Icean before 13 October.
Unito	Italy	The barque was wrecked in the Domingo River. Her crew survived.
Vorwärts'	Denmark	The schooner was lost at Mardyck, Nord, France on or about 19 October.
HM torpedo boat No. 62	Royal Navy	The torpedo boat was abandoned whilst being towed from Sydney, Nova Scotia to Halifax, Nova Scotia by HMS Buzzard (Royal Navy. Her 22 crew were rescued by the schooner Crane (United States). No. 62 was towed in to North Sydney by the fishing schooner Gloucester ( Dominion of Canada).
