= ORP Fala =

Coordinates: 54.177431°N 15.559715°E

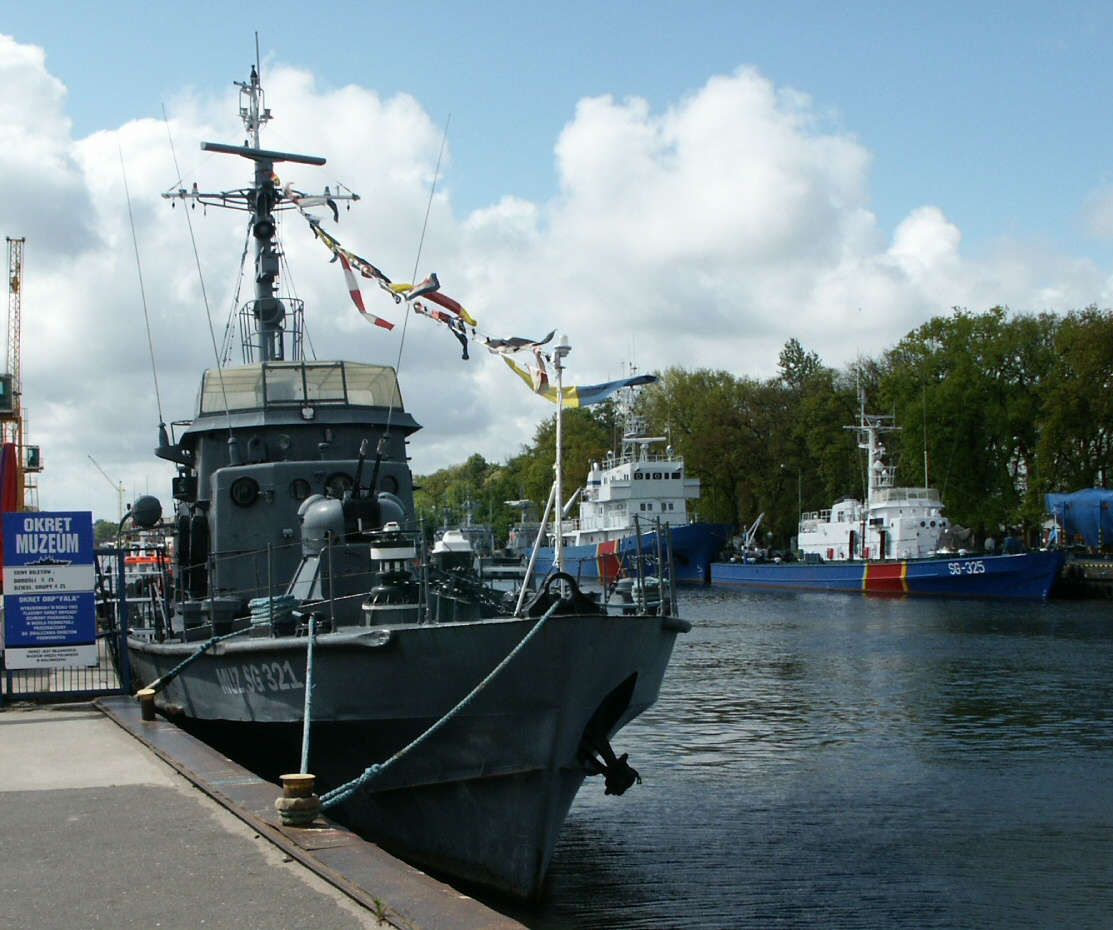
- ORP Fala as a museum ship in Kołobrzeg

History

Poland
- Name: ORP Fala
- Builder: Gdynia
- Commissioned: 1965
- Decommissioned: 1996
- Fate: Museum ship, Kołobrzeg

General characteristics
- Class & type: Project 912 class patrol craft
- Displacement: 237 long tons (241 t)
- Length: 41.35 m (135.7 ft)
- Beam: 6.3 m (21 ft)
- Draught: 1.84 m (6 ft 0 in)
- Speed: 24 knots (44 km/h; 28 mph)
- Armament: 2 × twin automatic 30mm AK-230 guns; 12 × depth charges (maximum: 24)

ORP Fala is a Polish patrol craft of the Project 912 class (NATO: Obluze Class). She was the first ship of a five-ship series, commissioned in 1965. Of a Polish design, they were built in Gdynia. Fala means 'the wave'.

She initially wore a number: OP-301, then: 321. Initially she served in the Border Brigade of the Polish Navy, then in 1991 she, along with the other four ships, was given to the Polish Border Guard (receiving a new livery).

After decommissioning in 1996, Fala was opened as a museum ship in Kolobrzeg, as part of the Muzeum Oręża Polskiego exhibition.

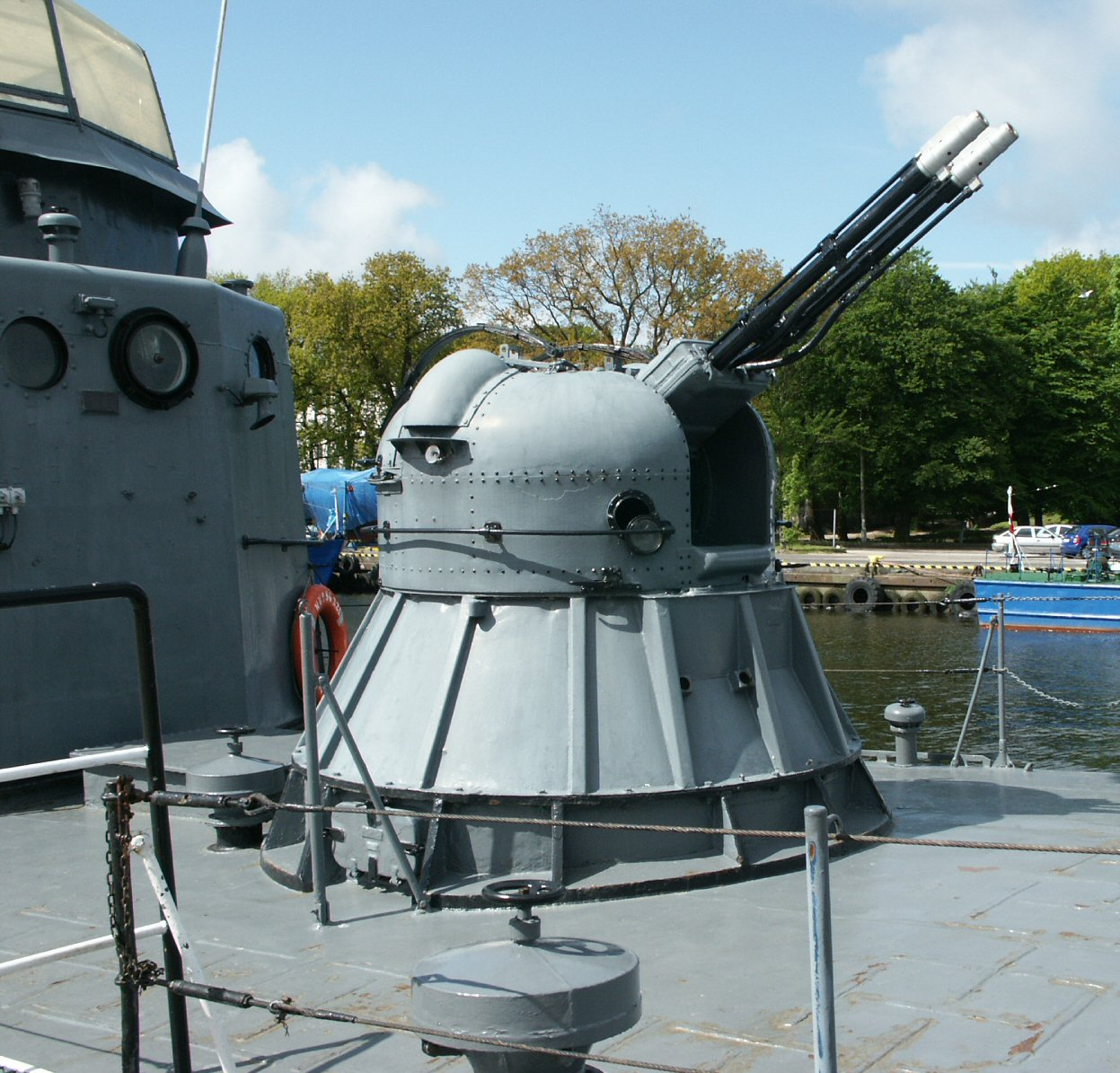
AK-230 gun
