= Maritime Unit of the Border Guard =

Polish Border Guard unit

- Morski Oddział Straży Granicznej
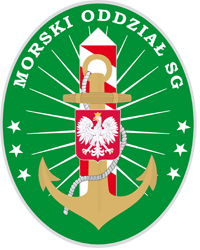

Agency overview
- Formed: 1 August 1991
- Headquarters: Gdańsk, Poland
- Agency executives: Rear Admiral Andrzej Prokopski, Commander; Cdr. Paweł Brzozowski, Deputy Commander; Cpt. (N) Lesław Krysa, Deputy Commander; Cpt. (N) Grzegorz Glista, Deputy Commander
- Website: https://www.morski.strazgraniczna.pl/

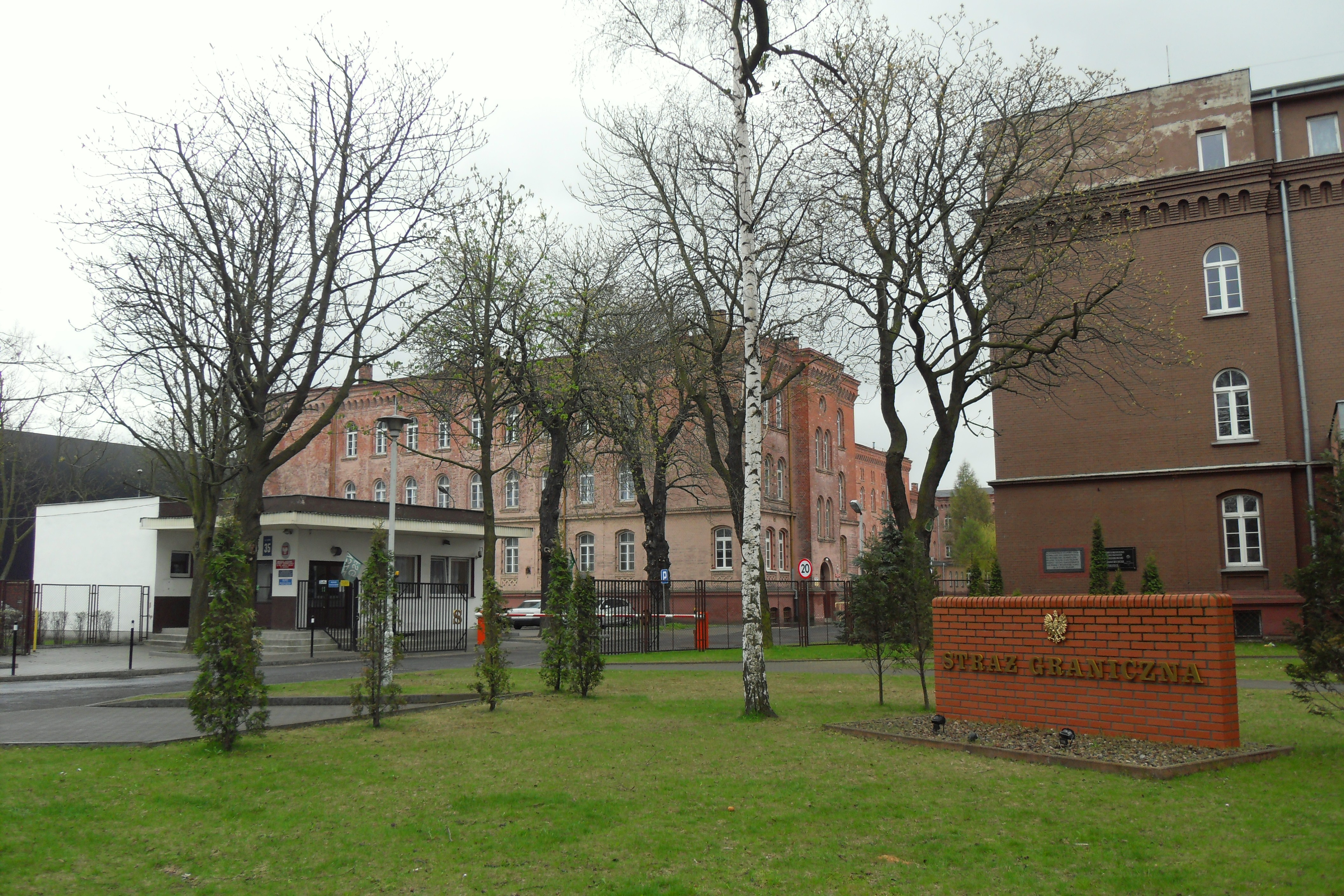
Headquarters of the Maritime Unit of the Border Guard

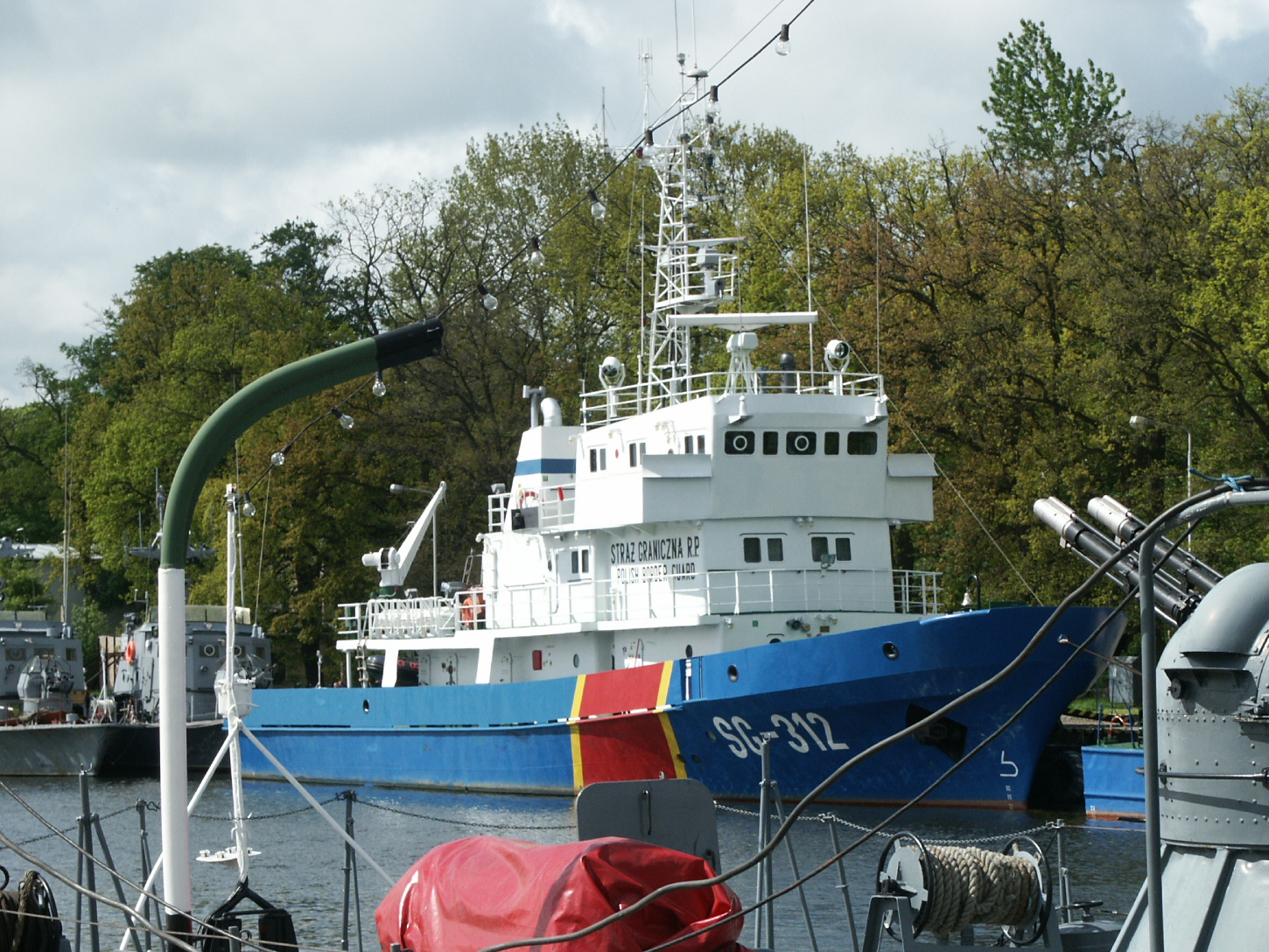
Coast Guard vessel SG-312 Kaper-2 in Kołobrzeg

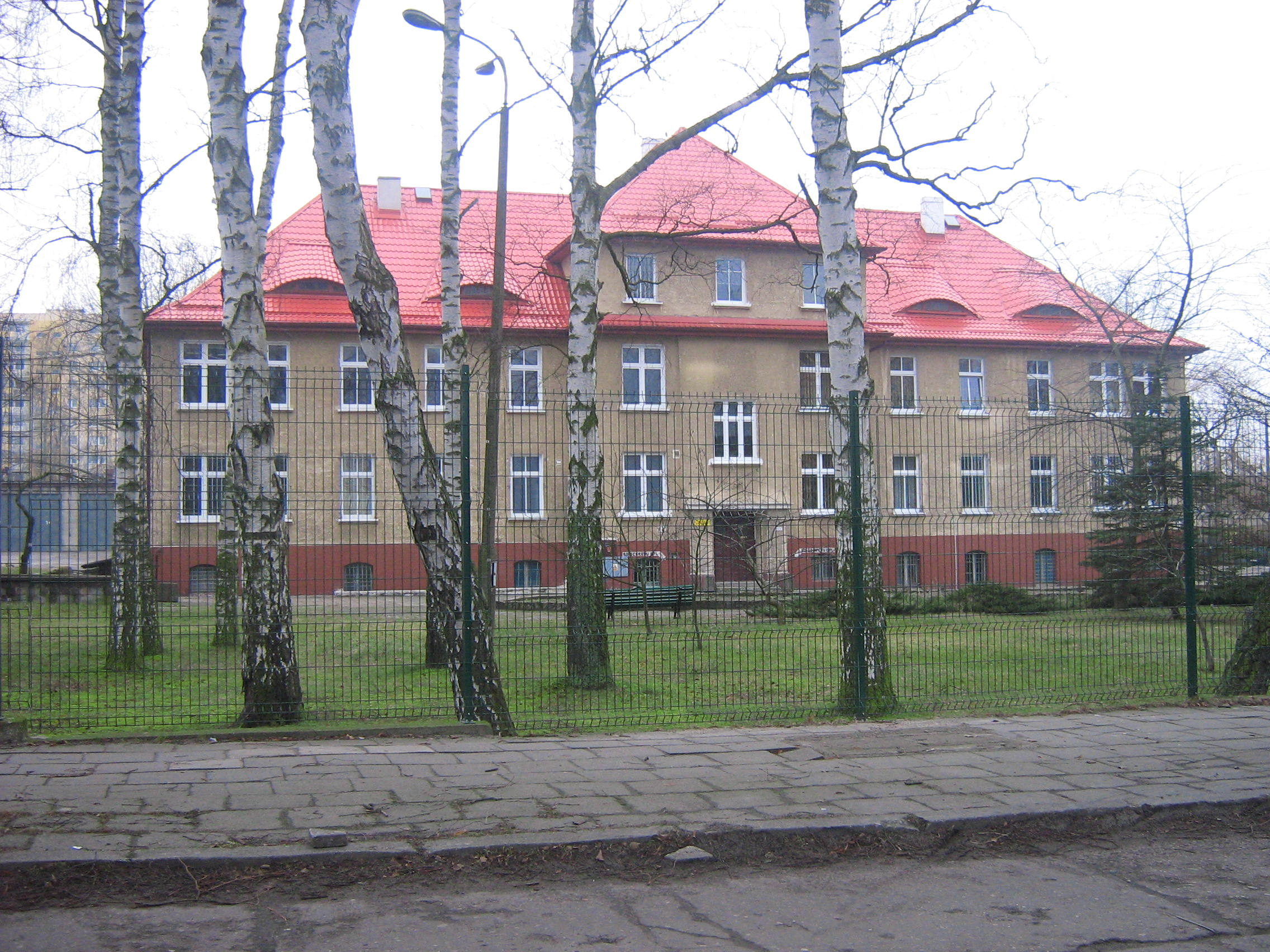
Pomeranian Coast Guard Squadron in Świnoujście

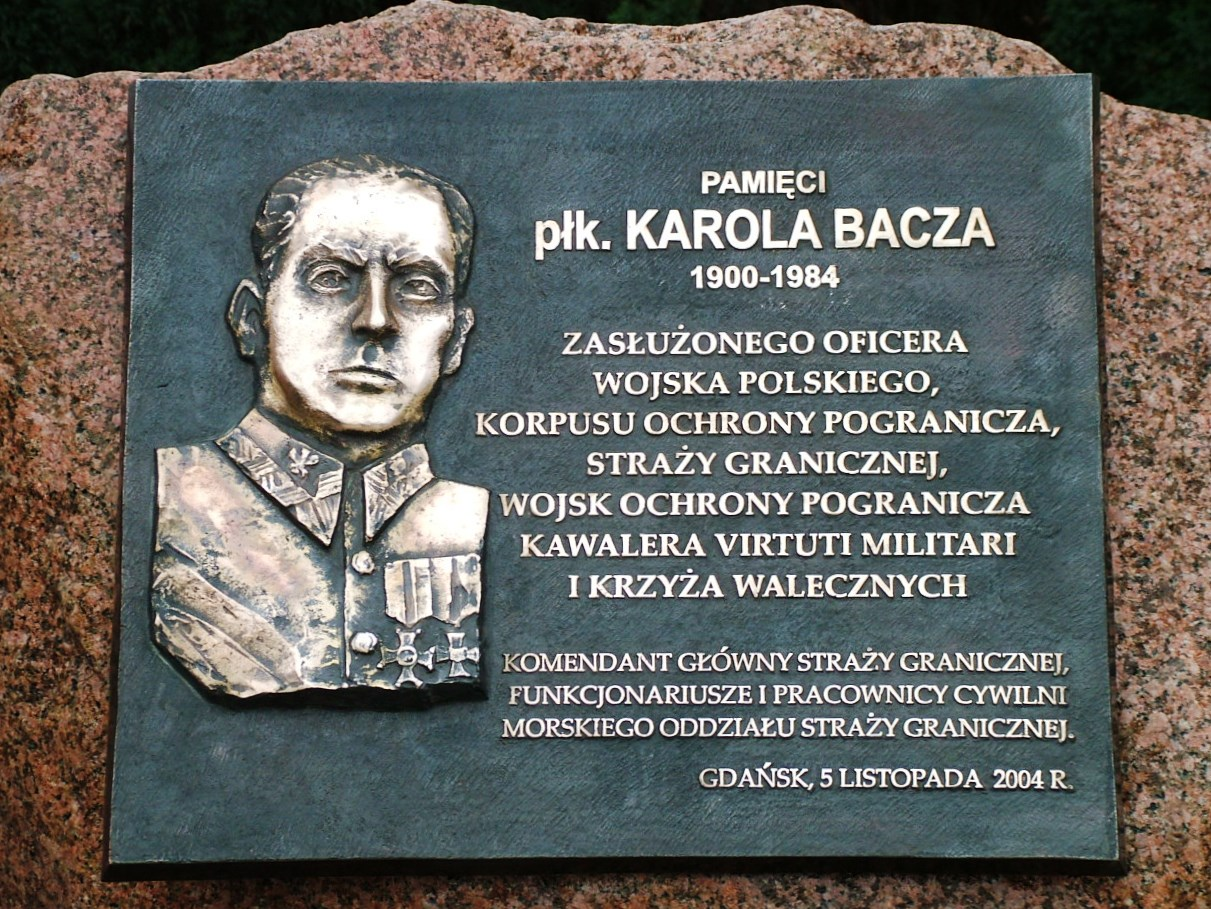
Plaque commemorating Karol Bacz

The Karol Bacz Maritime Unit of the Border Guard (Polish: Morski Oddział Straży Granicznej) is one of nine divisions of the Polish Border Guard. Its headquarters are located in Gdańsk.

== Formation and organizational changes ==
The Maritime Unit of the Border Guard was established on 1 August 1991, incorporating assets from the restructured Maritime Brigade of Border Guard Vessels, previously under the Polish Navy. In spring 1992, coastal Border Guard structures were reorganized, merging the division with forces from the disbanded Kashubian Unit of the Border Guard in Gdańsk, Baltic Unit of the Border Guard in Kołobrzeg, and parts of the Pomeranian Unit of the Border Guard in Szczecin.

In 2004, the division was named after Colonel Karol Bacz.

On 27 November 2006, the division received its standard.

On 2 November 2010, Order No. 64 of the Border Guard Commander-in-Chief introduced the division's official symbol.

== Tasks ==
The division's primary responsibilities include:

- Protecting the maritime border against illegal migration;
- Managing border control at crossing points, ensuring efficient and smooth operations;
- Detecting and prosecuting border-related crimes and offenses;
- Combating organized smuggling and preventing the trafficking of drugs, weapons, and radioactive substances through border crossings and from the open sea;
- Securing key communication routes;
- Maintaining public order and safety at border crossings, in air travel, on communication routes, Polish maritime areas, and the border zone;
- Safeguarding Poland's economic interests in its maritime areas;
- Identifying marine environmental pollution and its perpetrators;
- Participating in maritime search-and-rescue operations.

== Territorial scope ==
Since 1 July 2013, its jurisdiction includes Pomeranian Voivodeship, West Pomeranian Voivodeship, and parts of Warmian-Masurian Voivodeship (Elbląg County, the city of Elbląg, and Gmina Frombork in Braniewo County), as well as Polish maritime areas defined by separate regulations.

From 1 April 2011, the division's scope included Pomeranian Voivodeship, parts of West Pomeranian Voivodeship (Białogard County, Gryfice County, Kamień County, Kołobrzeg County, Koszalin County, Sławno County, and the cities of Koszalin and Świnoujście), parts of Warmian-Masurian Voivodeship (Elbląg County, Elbląg city, and Gmina Frombork), and Polish maritime areas, excluding internal waters on the Oder river north of the Port of Szczecin up to a line connecting Szczecin Lagoon shores via buoy TN-C and marker N on Chełminek island.

From 15 January 2002, the division covered Pomeranian Voivodeship, parts of West Pomeranian Voivodeship (Białogard, Gryfice, Kamień, Kołobrzeg, Koszalin, Sławno counties, and Koszalin city), Polish maritime areas (excluding Oder river internal waters north of Port of Szczecin), and Kuyavian-Pomeranian Voivodeship for air border crossings.

Until 2005, territorial units included the division commander, commanders of posts, border control points, and squadrons. After a 2005 reorganization, the structure comprises the division commander, commanders of posts, and squadrons.

== Organizational structure ==
Since 2003, the division's operations have been governed by Order No. 32 of the Border Guard Commander-in-Chief, dated 17 September 2003, amended by Orders No. 63 (28 August 2008) and No. 84 (16 November 2009).

As of 24 August 2005, the existing border guard posts and border control stations were replaced with Border Guard posts. Officers and employees serving and employed at the former border guard posts and border control stations became, respectively, officers and employees of the Border Guard posts.

The division operates a joint post with the German Federal Police at Pomellen, though it is not administratively distinct.

=== Border units (until 28 February 2015) ===
- Krynica Morska Border Guard Post;
- Międzyzdroje Border Guard Post (until 31 March 2010);
- Gdańsk Border Guard Post (until 28 February 2015);
- Gdańsk Lech Wałęsa Airport Border Guard Post (until 28 February 2015);
- Gdynia Border Guard Post;
- Władysławowo Border Guard Post;
- Ustka Border Guard Post;
- Kołobrzeg Border Guard Post;
- Darłowo Border Guard Post (until 28 February 2015);
- Łeba Border Guard Post (until 28 February 2015);
- Świnoujście Border Guard Post;
- Elbląg Border Guard Post;
- Rewal Border Guard Post (until 28 February 2015);
- Szczecin Border Guard Post (from 1 November 2013);
- Pomeranian Unit of the Border Guard Squadron in Świnoujście;
- Kashubian Unit of the Border Guard Squadron in Westerplatte.

=== Border units (from 1 March 2015) ===
- Szczecin Border Guard Post:
- Świnoujście Border Guard Post:
  - Rewal Outpost;
- Kołobrzeg Border Guard Post:
  - Darłowo Outpost;
- Ustka Border Guard Post:
- Władysławowo Border Guard Post:
  - Łeba Outpost;
- Gdynia Border Guard Post:
- Gdańsk Border Guard Post (established 1 March 2015);
- Krynica Morska Border Guard Post;
- Elbląg Border Guard Post:
- Pomeranian Unit of the Border Guard Squadron in Świnoujście;
- Kashubian Unit of the Border Guard Squadron in Gdańsk.

== Equipment ==
The division operates 56 vessels of various designs and patrol aircraft, including one PZL M28 Skytruck, two Let L-410 Turbolet, and one PZL W-3 Sokół helicopter, managed by the 1st Aviation Department of the Border Guard Headquarters.

Vessels include:

| Type | Units | Image | Purpose |
|---|---|---|---|
| OPV 70 | Generał Józef Haller (SG-301) | | Patrol |
| SKS-40 | Kaper-1 (SG-311), Kaper-2 (SG-312) | | Patrol |
| Patrol 240 Baltic | Patrol 1 (SG-111), Patrol 2 (SG-112) | | Patrol |
| SAR-1500 | Strażnik-1 (SG-211), Strażnik-2 (SG-212) | | Intervention-Pursuit |
| Griffon Hoverwork 2000TD | SG-411, SG-412 | | Hovercraft |
| IC 16 M III | Strażnik-3 (SG-213), Strażnik-4 (SG-214), Strażnik-5 (SG-215), Strażnik-6 (SG-216) | | Intervention-pursuit |
| Parker 900 Baltic | 4 units | | Intervention-pursuit |

Additional assets include:

- Two yachts;
- 30 rigid inflatable boats of various sizes, such as TM-1025 2IB CABIN, TM-923 OB, and TM-623 OB CABIN TECHNO MARINE.

In August 2019, a tender was issued for a 60–66 m full-sea patrol vessel with a minimum width of 10.5 m, draft of 3.5 m, and displacement of about 1,000 tons, capable of accommodating a 20-person crew plus 14 additional personnel for two weeks at sea. Only a consortium of Gdynia's Nauta and Naval Shipyards, part of the state-owned Polish Armaments Group, submitted a bid, valued at over 147.6 million PLN, exceeding the allocated 111.4 million PLN budget (partly funded by the 2014–2020 Internal Security Fund). In a retendered process, the French company Socarenam won the contract, with Gdańsk's Baltic Operator as a subcontractor.

In the second half of 2019, a third tender selected a private Malbork-based company to build a 20-meter patrol boat for the Kaszubski Coast Guard Squadron, to be delivered by 30 October 2020. The estimated 8 million PLN cost was doubled by bids from state shipyards.
