= Obłuże =

- District of Gdynia
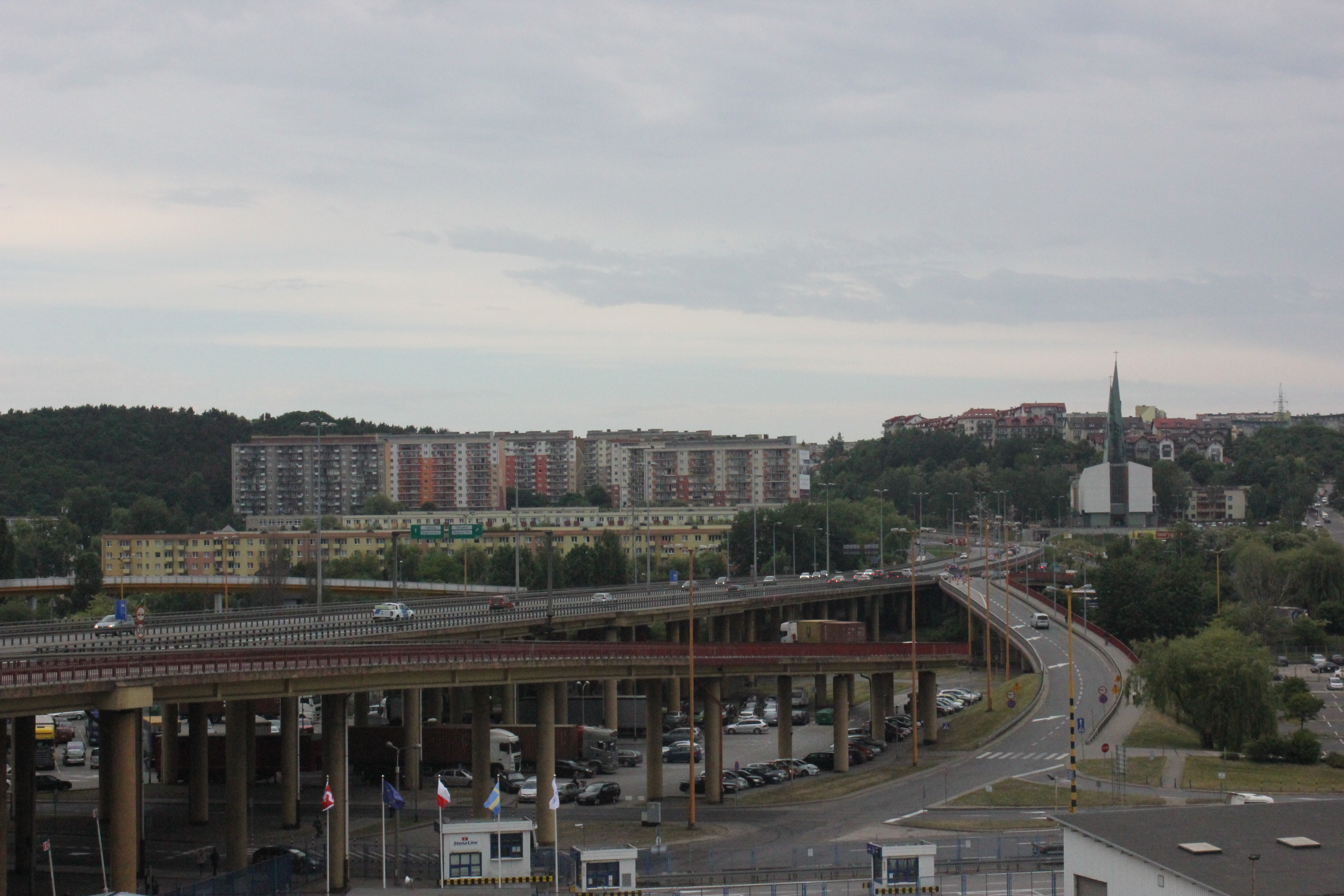

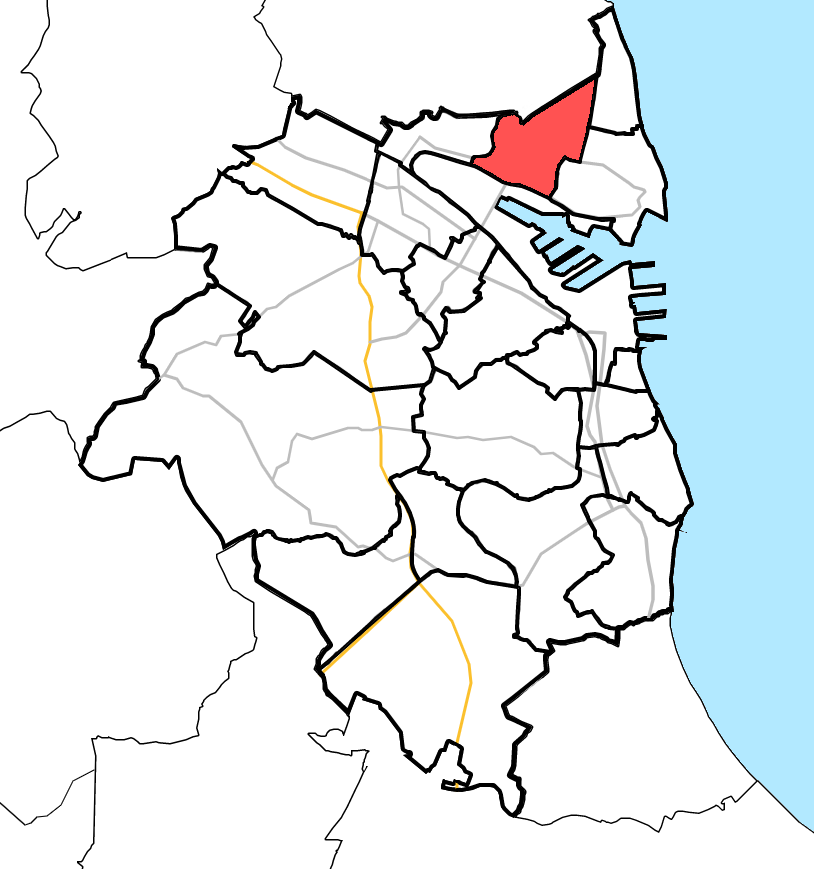
- Location of Obłuże within Gdynia
- Coordinates: 54°33′33″N 18°30′39″E
- Country: Poland
- Voivodeship: Pomeranian
- County/City: Gdynia
- Within city limits: 1933

Area
  - Total: 3.66 km^{2} (1.41 sq mi)

Population (2022)
  - Total: 17,436
  - Density: 4,760/km^{2} (12,300/sq mi)
- Time zone: UTC+1 (CET)
  - Summer (DST): UTC+2 (CEST)
- Vehicle registration: GA

Obłuże (Polish pronunciation; Kashubian: Òblëżé) is a district of Gdynia, Poland, located in the northern part of the city.

== History ==
Historical population
Year	Pop.
1921	260
2022	17,436

Obłuże was once a possession of the Premonstratensian Monastery in Żukowo, administratively located in the Puck County in the Pomeranian Voivodeship of the Kingdom of Poland.

During the German occupation of Poland in World War II, on October 26, 1939, Obłuże was the second district of Gdynia (after Orłowo), whose Polish inhabitants were expelled from the city to be replaced by German colonists as part of the Lebensraum policy. On the night of 10–11 November, the German security police carried out mass arrests of over 1,500 Poles in the district, and then perpetrated a public execution of 23 young men aged 16–20, in retaliation for "breaking windows at the headquarters of the German security police" (see Nazi crimes against the Polish nation).
