= Çatalada =

Turkish island located in the Aegean Sea

Çatalada, a.k.a. Çatal Ada, (formerly known as Volo) (37°00′10″N 27°12′50″E) is a Turkish island located in the Aegean Sea, 3 miles (5 kilometres) off the town Turgutreis, west of Bodrum peninsula in southwestern Turkey. An island with three conical hills, its name means literally "fork island".

In the past it was one of the Xenagorou islands (Ancient Greek: Ξεναγόρου νῆσοι).

The island's main economy is tourism, as cruises from the mainland are regular. It is also a popular scuba diving place.

Neighbouring islands in close distance are Topan Adası, Çoban Adası and Yassıada.
