= Museum of Polish Arms =

Military museum in Kołobrzeg, Poland

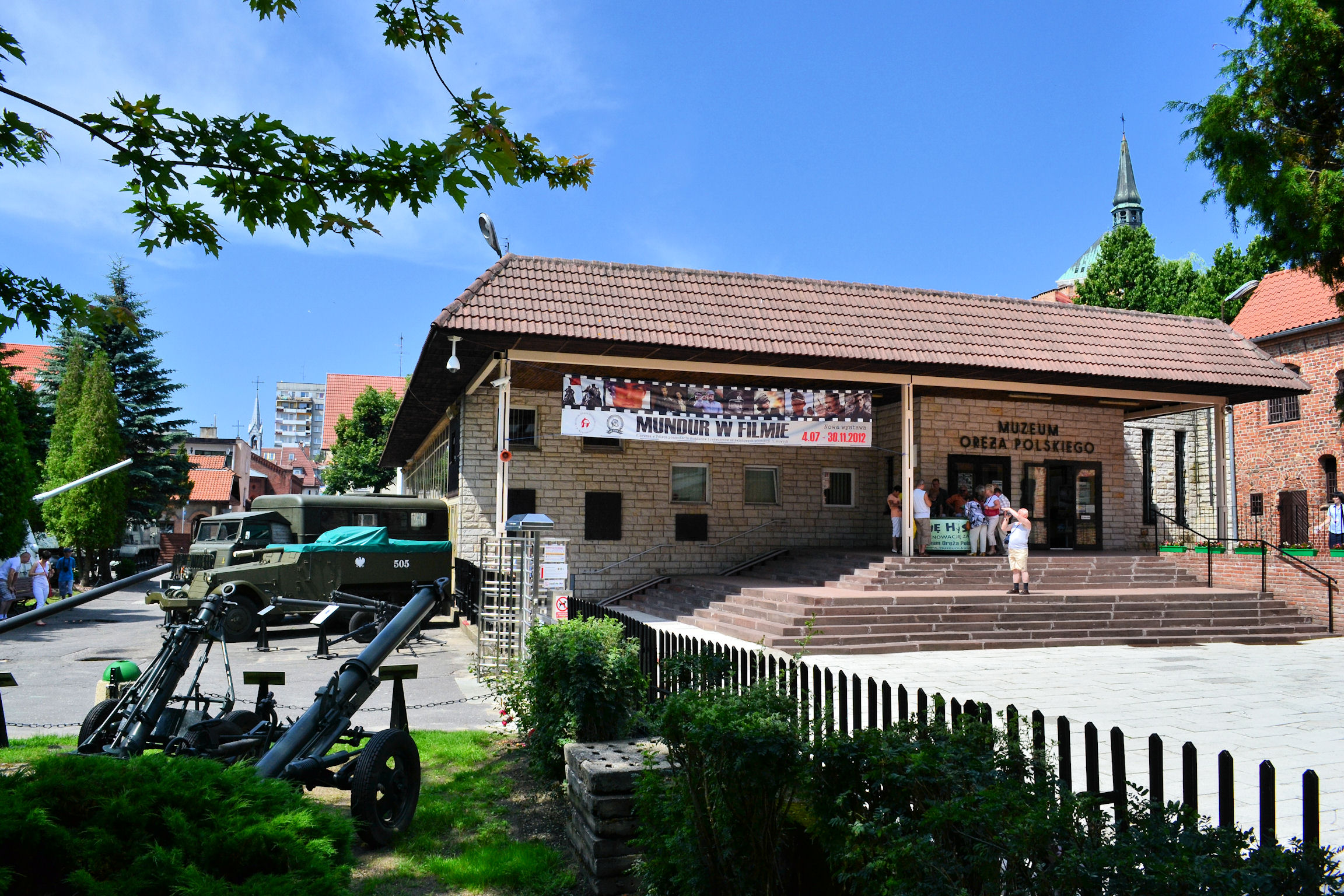
Museum of Polish Arms

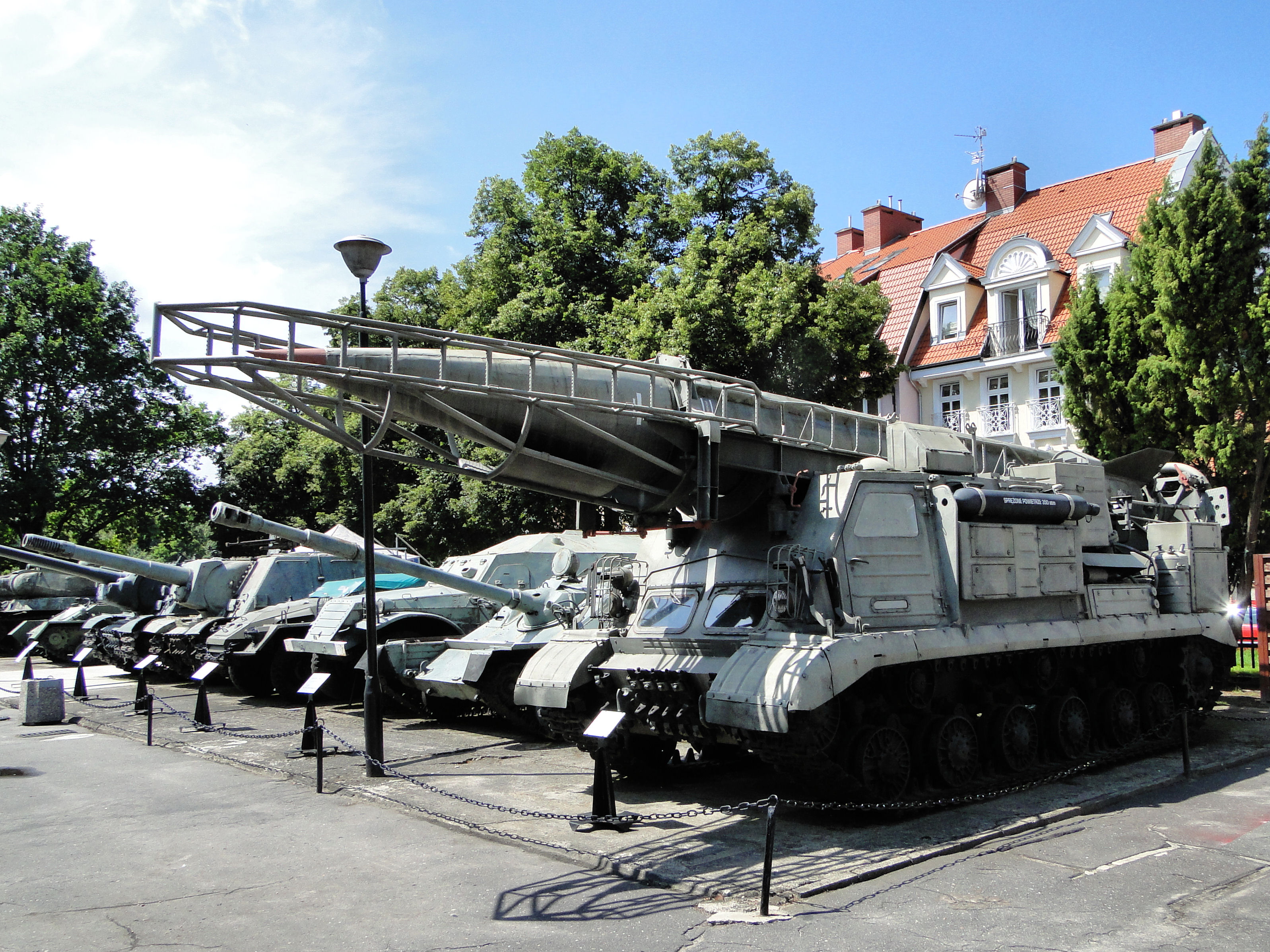
Museum of Polish Arms

The Museum of Polish Arms (Polish: Muzeum Oręża Polskiego) is a museum in Kołobrzeg, Poland. Its main feature is a collection of militaria related to the military of Poland from the early Middle Ages to the present. In addition to its military collection, the museum also has a department focusing on the history of the city of Kołobrzeg.

Notable elements of the museum collection include vehicles like the S600 Sokół motorcycle, several tanks and planes (such as the PZL TS-8 Bies, a Sukhoi Su-22, and a Ilyushin Il-28) and the ORP Fala museum ship.
