= Cedar Island (Alaska) =

Island in Alaska, United States

Cedar Island is an island in Moser Bay in Alaska and is the nearest island to the town of Loring, approximately 80 miles (130 km) NNW of Prince Rupert, British Columbia.

Cedar Island is located at 55°35′00″N 131°40′39″W (55.58333, -131.6775).

== Transportation ==
All transportation to and from the island is by boat.
