= Chełminek =

Coordinates: 53.674268°N 14.530798°E

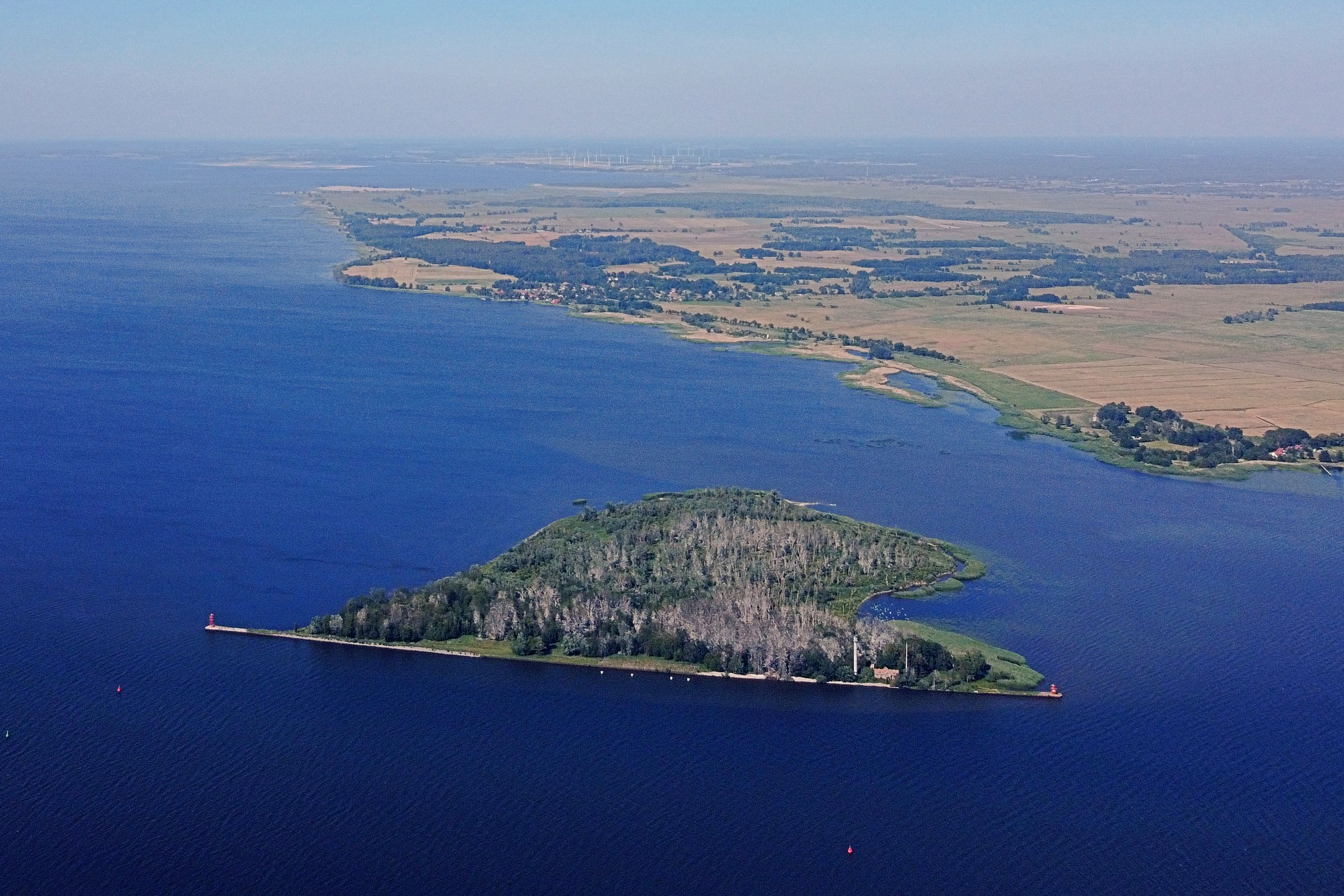
- Arial view of the island from the west coast, 2022
- Interactive map of Chełminek

Geography
- Location: Szczecin Lagoon
- Area: 0.08 km^{2} (0.031 sq mi)
- Highest elevation: 1.7 m (5.6 ft)

Administration
- Poland
- Voivodeship: West Pomeranian
- Powiat: Goleniów
- Gmina: Gmina Stepnica

Demographics
- Population: 0 (2015)

Chełminek (German: Leitholm) is an artificial island in the Szczecin Lagoon. Located between Trzebież and Świętowice, the island is around 0.08 square kilometres (0.031 sq mi) in area and lies roughly 1.7 metres (5.6 ft) above sea level. As of 2015, the island is uninhabited and its infrastructure is mostly overgrown. Entry onto the island is forbidden due to the island now serving as a site for bird conservation.

== History ==
The island was created between 1889 and 1906 by dredging the Szczecin-Świnoujście waterway, located just west of the island. There are two lighthouses on the island, including a house previously occupied by a lighthouse keeper; as well as old narrow-gauge railway tracks and a small marina. During World War II, the island was likely home to German naval commandos, either using it as a training sight or as a testing ground for a new weapon ━ remotely controlled motorboats with explosives. The island received its modern Polish name by decree in 1949.
