= Coelleira =

Island of Spain

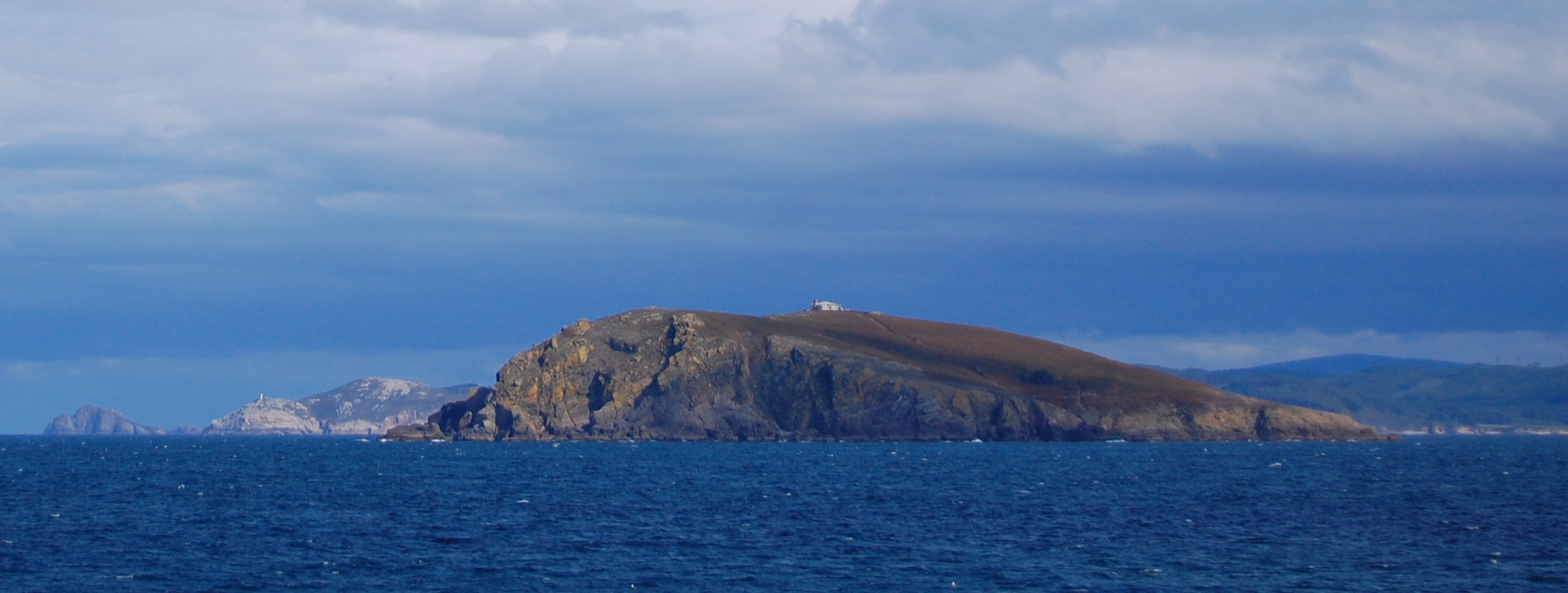

- Location in Spain

Geography
- Coordinates: 43.759°N 7.631°W
- Area: 0.26 km^{2} (0.10 sq mi)
- Highest elevation: 80 m (260 ft)

Administration
- Spain
- Autonomous community: Galicia
- Province: Lugo
- Municipality: O Vicedo

Demographics
- Population: 0

Illa Coelleira, or Colleira (Spanish: Isla Conejera, literal translation: Rabbits' Island), is a small island located in the mouth of the Barqueiro river, off the town of Viveiro, in the Rias Altas coastal region of Galicia, Spain. The island is part of O Vicedo municipality. It is known best as the site of a former monastery, and today houses a lighthouse to aid navigation.

== Name ==
The island's Galician name, Illa Coelleira, means "island of the rabbits", a reference to the numerous rabbits that today inhabit the otherwise bare island. Documents show its name in the 11th century as Quonicularia.

== History ==
Historians have speculated that the monastery was founded during the reign of Leovigildo (573-586 AD), a period during which Christians were persecuted. This theory holds that the monastery was populated with monks fleeing the monastery of San Claudius of León, who then spread out to work throughout Galicia.

A firm record exists of a donation by Vimara Menéndez to the monastery of San Miguel de Quonicularia in 1095. The donation gave over to the monastery one third of the church of San Julian de Loiva under an intermediary bishop, Gonzalo.

Little record of the island exists from the 11th to 15th centuries. Some accounts describe the island being settled by Templars, who were then massacred in 1307. Reports resume in the 15th century, with the 1485 union of the island monastery with the mainland monastery of San Martiño de Mondoñedo under prior Ares Pérez de Viladonga. There followed numerous difficulties for the Coelleira monastery, until in 1534 a papal bull annexed the monastery to Mondoñedo Cathedral.
