= Cedar Island (Oregon) =

Island in Clackamas County, Oregon, United States

- Interactive map of Cedar Island

Geography
- Coordinates: 45°23′25″N 122°37′39″W
- Adjacent to: Willamette River
- Area: 5.7 ha (14 acres)
- Highest elevation: 20 m (70 ft)

Administration
- United States
- State: Oregon
- County: Clackamas

Demographics
- Population: 0

Cedar Island is a horseshoe-shaped island in the Willamette River in Clackamas County, Oregon. It is located within the city limits of West Linn, Oregon, and is a West Linn city park. The island is accessible by floating bridge during the spring, summer, and fall months. About half of Cedar Island was dredged in order to mine gravel, creating a large lagoon in the center of the island. The island is primarily used for recreational purposes such as fishing, hiking, and wildlife viewing.
