= Moncho Iglesias Míguez =

Galician writer

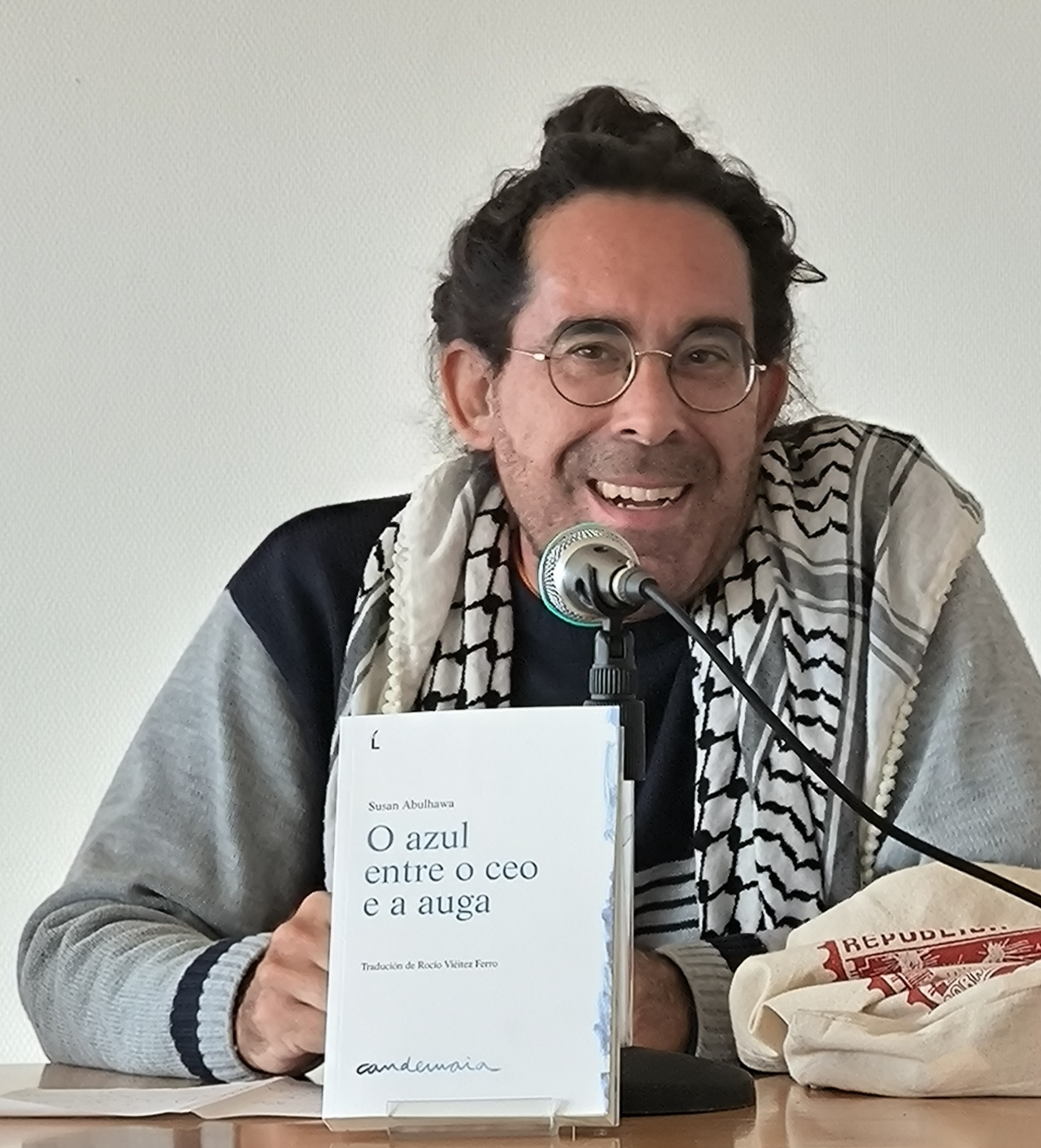
- Born: April 6, 1974 Vigo, Galicia, Spain
- Occupation: Novelist, Poet
- Language: Galician, Spanish

Moncho Iglesias Míguez (born 6 April 1974, Vigo) is a Galician writer and translator.

== Early life ==
Bachelor of Spanish Philology from the University of Vigo, he is doing his PDH in Galician Philology, with a thesis that compares Palestinian and Galician folktales. He lived in Palestine, where he taught Spanish, at Bethlehem University and An-Najah University, Nablus, and later on in Chongqing.

He has collaborated with the newspapers Vieiros, and Xornal de Galicia, and the magazines A Nosa Terra and Animal, and was correspondent of the Radio Galega. He currently works with Tempos Novos , Dorna and Praza Pública.

== Literary works ==
=== Poetry ===
- -3'141516, 2001, Centro Universitario Indoamericano (Mexico).
- Oda ás nais perennes con fillos caducos entre os brazos, 2007, Positivas.
- pedras de Plastilina, 2012, Toxosoutos.
- Avoíña/Abuelita, 2013, Parnass Ediciones. Bilingual Galician-Spanish.
- Tren, O tren lírico que cruza China visto con ollos vigueses, 2018, Urutau.
- Cheira, 2020, Urutau.
- Baobab, 2025. Tempo Galiza.

=== Narrative ===
- Tres cores: azul,2010, Estaleiro editora.
- Don Pepe Do Peirao.

=== Essay ===
- Os contos de animais na tradición oral palestina, 2008, [[Fundación Araguaney]].

=== Translations ===
- Premio 2005 de relato, poesía e tradución da Universidade de Vigo ("Unha rosa para Emily", by William Faulkner), 2015, Edicións Xerais.
- O condutor de autobús que quería ser Deus, by Etgar Keret, 2006, Rinoceronte Editora, from Hebrew.
- Saudades de Kissinger, by Etgar Keret, 2011, Rinoceronte Editora, from Hebrew.
- Carné de identidade, by Mahmoud Darwish, 2012, Edicións Barbantesa.
- Premio 2014 de relato, poesía e tradución da Universidade de Vigo ("A terra das laranxas tristes", by Ghassan Kanafani), 2014, Edicións Xerais.
- Premio 2015 de relato, poesía e tradución da Universidade de Vigo ("Fío", by Dena Afrasiabi)', 2015, Edicións Xerais.
- Un mapa do lar, by Randa Jarrar, 2015, Hugin e Munin.
- Premio 2016 de relato, poesía e tradución da Universidade de Vigo ("O último rei de Noruega", by Amos Oz), 2016, Edicións Xerais.
- Premio 2017 de relato, poesía e tradución da Universidade de Vigo ("A historia secreta da alfombra voadora", by Azhar Abidi e "As mozas do edificio", by Randa Jarrar), 2017, Edicións Xerais.
- Premio 2018 de relato, poesía e tradución da Universidade de Vigo ("O sol e as súas flores", by Rupi Kaur, 2018, Edicións Xerais.
- Esfumado, by Ahmed Masoudhttps://www.ahmedmasoud.co.uk/, 2022, gl:Urutau.

=== Collective works ===
- Homenaxe a Álvaro Cunqueiro no seu XXV cabodano, 2006.
- I Certame literario de relato breve e libertario, 2007.
- A Coruña á luz das letras, 2008, Trifolium.
- Entre os outros e nós. Estudos literarios e culturais, 2008.
- Diversidade lingüística e cultural no ensino de linguas, 2009, tresCtres.
- En defensa do Poleiro. Os escritores galegos en Celanova, 2010, Toxosoutos.
- Os dereitos humanos: unha ollada múltipleOs dereitos humanos. Unha ollada múltiple, 2011, Universidade de Santiago de Compostela.
- 150 Cantares para Rosalía de Castro (2015, e-book).
- As cantigas de Martín Codax en 55 idiomas, Martin Codax convértese no autor galego traducido a máis linguas, 2018, Universidade de Vigo.
- A lingua viaxeira, 2022, Axóuxere.
- "Cantos de dor e liberdade, voces galegas por Palestina", 2024, Tempo Galiza.

== Prizes ==
- Third Poetry Prize Féile Filíochta, Dublin, 1999.
- Narrative Prize, Concello de Mugardos, 2005.
- Special mention, Narrative Prize, Concello de Mugardos, 2010.
- Second Prize, Certame Poético Concello de Rois, 2014.
- First Prize, IV Certame Literario das Letras Galegas en Frankfourt, 2015.
- Second Prize, Concurso do Día das Letras Galegas, Concello de Rábade, 2017.
- Translation Prizes, Premio de tradución da Universidade de Vigo, 2005, 2014, 2015, 2016, 2017 & 2018.
- Johan Carballeira Prize in Journalism, 2018
- First Prize, XV Certame Literario Terras de Chamoso, O Corgo, 2021
