= Pablo Villamar =

Spanish politician (born 1961)

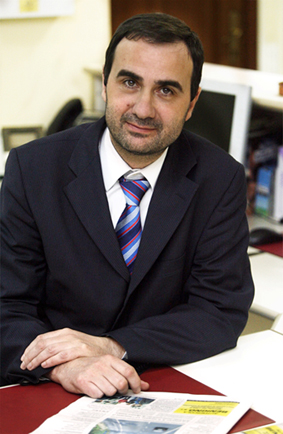

Vice President of the Province of Coruña (Galicia)
- Incumbent
- Assumed office July 28, 2007
- President: Salvador Fernández Moreda
- Preceded by: Xaime Bello

Personal details
- Born: December 20, 1961 (age 64) Narón, Galicia (Spain)
- Party: BNG (Galician Nationalist Bloc)
- Occupation: Politician

Pablo Villamar Díaz (born 20 December 1961) is a Spanish politician. He is the Vice President of Province of A Coruña in Galicia.

Born in Narón (Galicia), Pablo Villamar was organizational technician in the Navantia company. He entered politics in 1977. Connected to the Galician nationalism since youth, he became part of the Galician Nationalist Bloc (BNG), and in 1999 assumed relief institutional functions. First he was a councilman in Narón between the years 1999 and 2003, later as deputy in the province of A Coruña dedicated to the area of tourism (2003-2007) and finally as vice president of the "Deputación da Coruña", a position he acquired in 2007 and still retains today.
