= Pile barrage =

Coastal defence structure

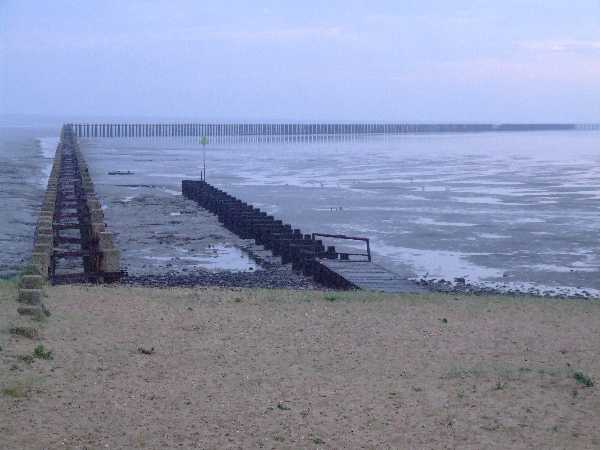
Pile barrage of the Shoeburyness Boom, United Kingdom

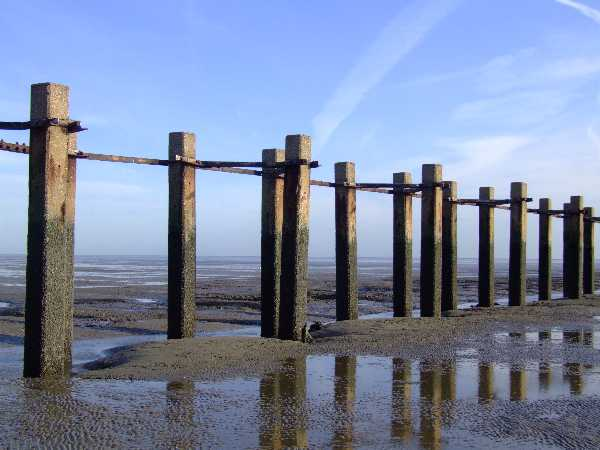
Close-up of a pile barrage from the Shoeburyness Boom, United Kingdom

Pile barrages, among other names (see § Terminology), are underwater barricades or barrages used for coastal military defence. They are constructed with piles, vertical poles or stakes driven into the bed of a body of water, extending up to, or above, the water line to block the passage of watercraft. They are sometimes also mixed with floating booms and thereof (compare Shoeburyness Boom).

They have been used since prehistory to prevent enemy watercraft from entering waterways or harbors, etc., as to protect the sailing routes to trading posts and settlements.

== Terminology ==
The defensive structure lacks an established English name. Various sources either gives it a descriptive name: "pile barrage", "pole barrage", "pole-built barrage", "pile barrier", "underwater barrier", "pole blockage", etc., mainly derived from Swedish: pålspärr ("pole barrage"); while others simply use unspecified terms, such as "barrage" or "barrier".

A descriptive term could potentially be "staked or piled waterway", based on Old Norse nomenclature: "stikudu Gautar Gautelfi" ("the Geats staked Göta river").

The Old Norse name for the structure was an ablaut-form cognate to "stake" – Old West Norse: stik, stika; Old East Norse: stœk, stækh; surviving as Danish: steg, dialectally: stege, Norwegian Nynorsk: stik, stike, Swedish: stäk, steg, stig, stag, dialectally: stika, stiku; variously meaning pole, stake etc., including strait, and archaicly pile barrage etc.

== Description ==
=== Use ===
As a defensive measure, pile barrages allows the defender to control the engagement of enemy coastal attacks; by hindering armadas from entering and landing where they want, the landing party can be forced to step ashore further away from the target than intended, giving time for the defender to prepare defenses, and forcing the enemy to travel by land, wasting them time and energy; potentially, blocking the enemy armada far away enough to where it is forced to cancel the invasion by practicality; alternatively, the enemy armada can be forced into passages where the defender can perform controlled ambushes.

As a civilian measure, pile barrages have also been used to block a waterway as a kind of customs fence, with the aim of forcing ships with dutiable goods past a customs station. An example of this is Pålsundet in Stockholm, dating back to the time of Gustavus Adolphus. It was introduced in 1622 as a toll station for traffic to and from the lake Mälaren and the strait was staked to stop evaders.

=== Construction ===
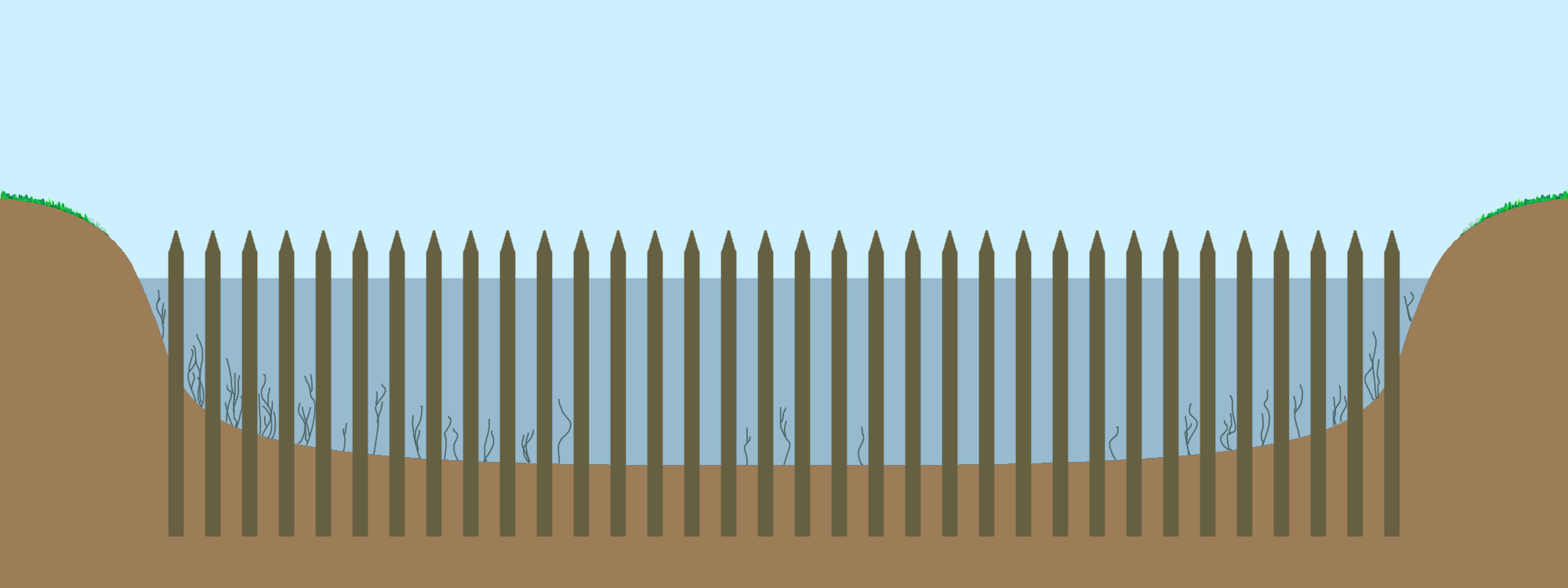
Simple pile barrage principle

Pile barrages can be tens of meters in depth; the piles, usually full length tree trunks, being driven down at down at least a third below the bottom, to resist ship hits, and outfitted with barbs carved into them, as to prevent foes from pulling them up and escaping through.

== Northern Europe ==
Pile barrages were common in Northern Europe during the Iron Age into the Medieval Period, especially in Norse Scandinavia (Old West Norse: stik; Old East Norse: stœk; cognate to "stake"), still found in many placenames related to waterways in Sweden: Almarestäket ("the Almare stake"), Baggensstäket ("the Baggen stake"), Stegeborg ("Stake fort"), Stocksundet ("the Stock sound"), Pålsundet ("the Pole sound"), among many others.

=== Iron Age ===
According to the Old Norse-Icelandic rendering of Historia Regum Britanniae: Breta sögur ("Sagas of the Britons"), the Britons had stakes, armored with lead and iron, driven into the river Thames, in order to protect themselves from the Roman fleet: "hann let stik gera i ana Temps" ("he had a "pile barrage" made in the Thames").

=== Viking Age ===
Viking Age pile barrages are described various times in the written corpus. In Snorri Sturlason's Heimskringla, it is told how Harald Fairhair, around 870–900, who had recently succeeded in uniting Norway, intended to expand his empire with attacks in the Göta river (Old Norse: Gautelfur). In the spring when the ice broke up, the Geats "staked" (pile barraged) the Göta river so that the king would not be able to bring his ships up the country: "stikudu Gautar Gautelfi" ("the Geats staked Göta river"). He then steered his ships up the River and docked at "stikin" (the pile barrage), ravaged both banks and burned the countryside. In Saint Olaf's Saga, "stik" (pile barrages) is mentioned regarding defensive measures in the unidentified lake "Lagen" in Sweden. The Danish historian Saxo Grammaticus mentions that, in the 1150s, the Danes blocked bays and fjords with long piles against the Slavic pirate ships (see Wends). Baggensstäket ("the Baggen stake") in the Stockholm archipelago is named the "Harustik" in the Danish Census Book's itinerarium from 1231. Stegeborg ("Stake fort") is first mentioned in 1290–1296 as "castrum Stakæburgh" and in 1310 as "Stækaborg".

Several Viking Age pile barrages have been found and excavated. On the seabed in the strait between western Skällö and eastern Skällö, the remains of a 290 meter long prehistoric Viking Age pile barrage has been found. It blocked the strait and forced ships to take a detour past neighbouring Skällenäs. The piles, which are made of oak, beech and birch, have been driven 1 to 2 metres (3.3 to 6.6 ft) into the bottom. Such were examined by Blekinge Museum in 2023 and dated to around 1050.

=== Middle Ages ===
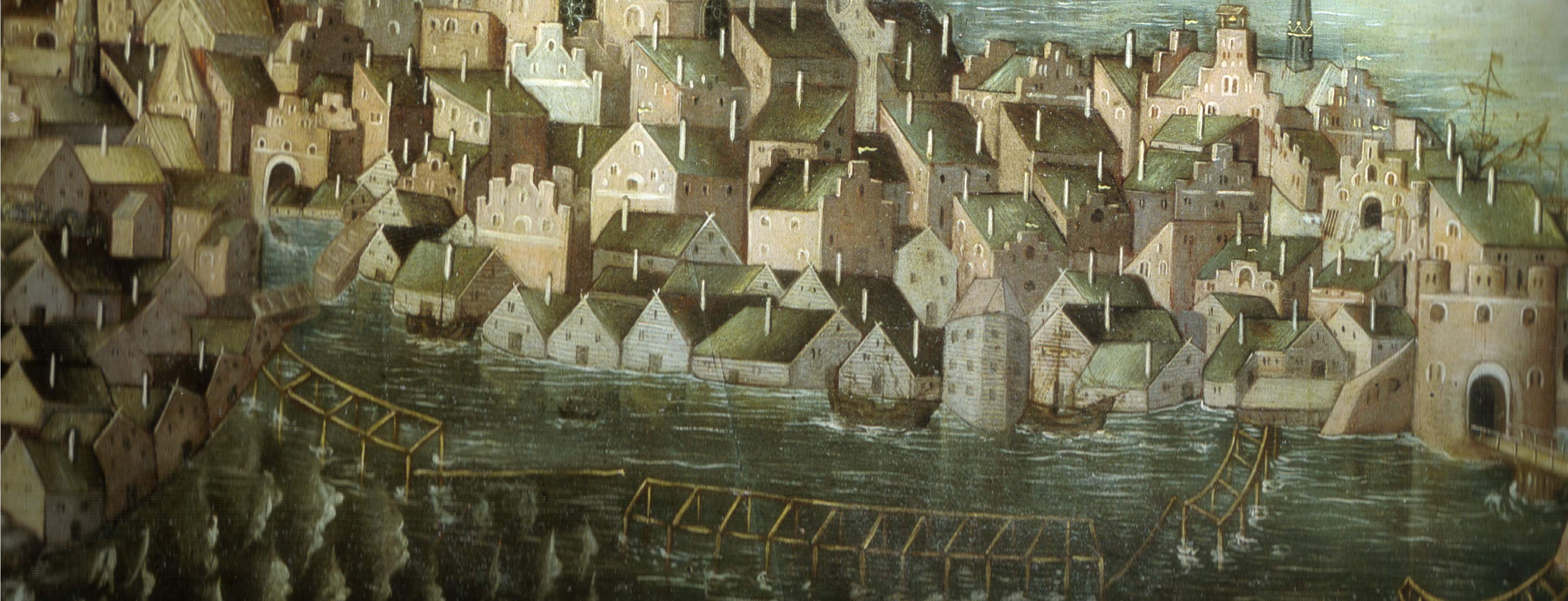
Part of Stockholm's old "city pile wall" on Vädersolstavlan (1535)

A famous Nordic pile barrage was the Medieval "city pile wall" of Stockholm (Swedish: pålkrans, "pile ring"), during the Middle Ages, simply called "the boom" (Swedish: bommen, compare English: Boom (navigational barrier)). Like the city gate, the boom could be opened and locked. The opening parts were of a floating raft construction made of linked logs. The barrier had several entrance openings that were closed with bars at night and in case of danger. The structure functioned both as a customs fence and a boundary for the inner port area.

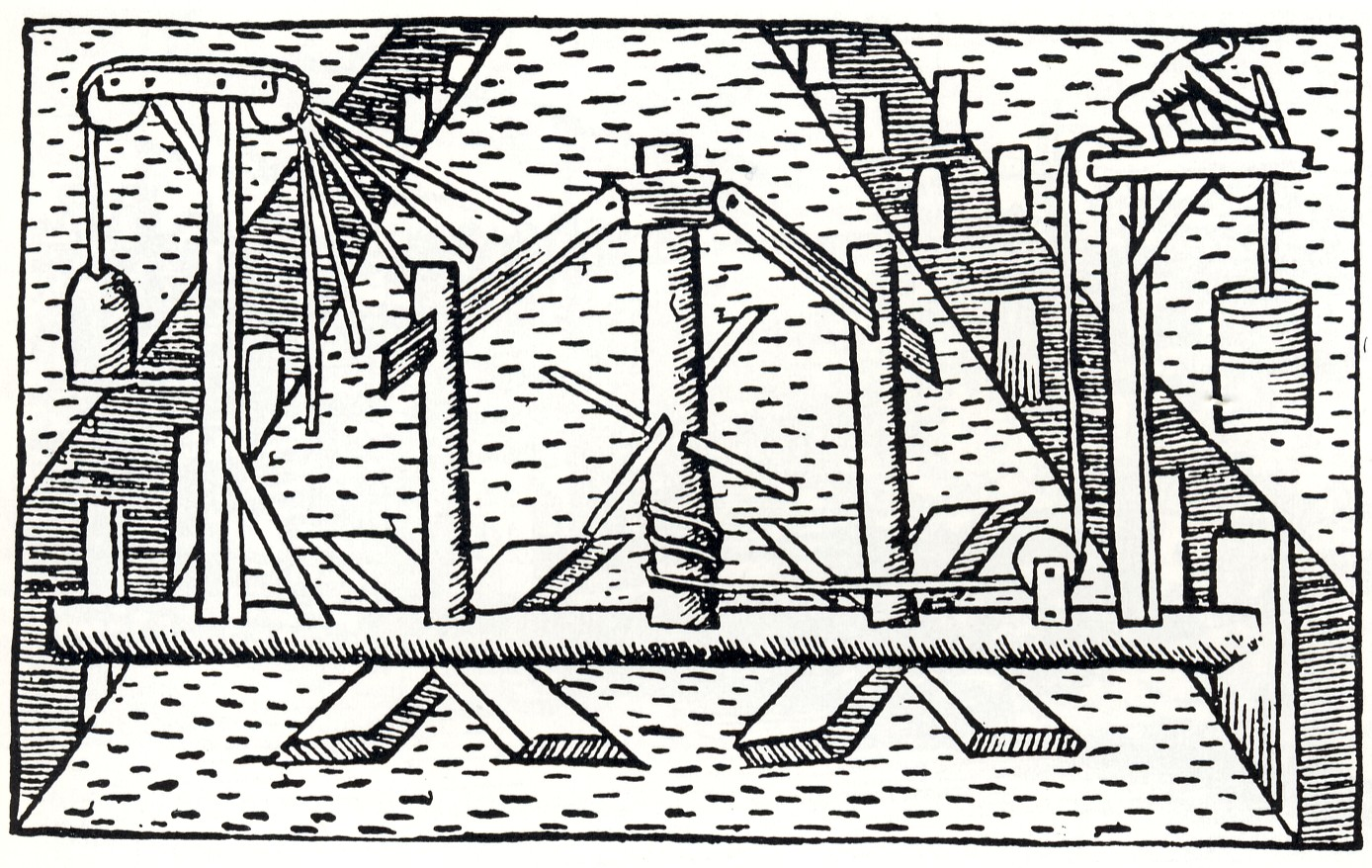
The Stockholm pile driver operating on ice, from Olaus Magnus' A Description of the Northern Peoples (1555).

Due to erosion, the piles had to be replaced regularly. During the early 16th century, several hundred poles were purchased that were 24 meters long and more, due to the delpth in certain locations. Later, it was difficult to obtain such long logs and people began to join logs using nails and forged joint rings. A special pile driver was used to drive the piles into the lakebed, which was mounted on the city's barge. In winter, the piles could be driven down from the ice.

=== 20th century ===
The British Shoeburyness Boom was constructed at the start of the Second World War in the Thames Estuary to prevent the incursion of submarines through a navigational channel that led to the Thames. In its shallow parts, it consisted of wooden (and later concrete) piles driven into the sea bed.

== See also ==
- Boom (navigational barrier)
