= Boom (navigational barrier) =

Navigational barrier

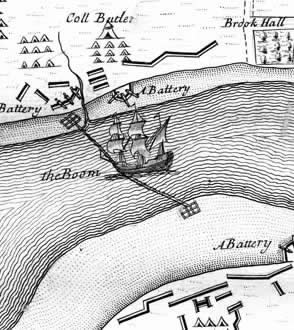
A boom blocking the River Foyle during the siege of Derry

A boom or a chain (also boom defence, harbour chain, river chain, chain boom, boom chain or variants) is an obstacle strung across a navigable stretch of water to control or block navigation. They are sometimes mixed with pile barrages.

In modern times they usually have civil uses, such as to prevent access to a dangerous river channel. But, especially historically, they have been used militarily, with the goal of denying access to an enemy's ships: a modern example is the anti-submarine net.

Booms have also been used to force passing vessels to pay a toll.

== Description ==
A boom generally floats on the surface, while a chain can be on the surface or below the water. A chain could be made to float with rafts, logs, ships or other wood, making the chain a boom as well.

== Historical uses ==
Especially in medieval times, the end of a chain could be attached to a chain tower or boom tower. This allowed safe raising or lowering of the chain, as they were often heavily fortified. By raising or lowering a chain or boom, access could be selectively granted rather than simply rendering the stretch of water completely inaccessible. The raising and lowering could be accomplished by a windlass mechanism or a capstan.

Booms or chains could be broken by a sufficiently large or heavy ship, and this occurred on many occasions, including the siege of Damietta, the raid on the Medway and the Battle of Vigo Bay.^{A} Frequently, however, attackers instead seized the defences and cut the chain or boom by more conventional methods. The boom at the siege of Derry, for example, was cut by sailors in a longboat.

As a key portion of defences, booms were usually heavily defended. This involved shore-based chain towers, artillery batteries, or forts. In the Age of Sail, a boom protecting a harbour could have several ships defending it with their broadsides, discouraging assaults on the boom. On some occasions, multiple booms spanned a single stretch of water.

== Gallery ==
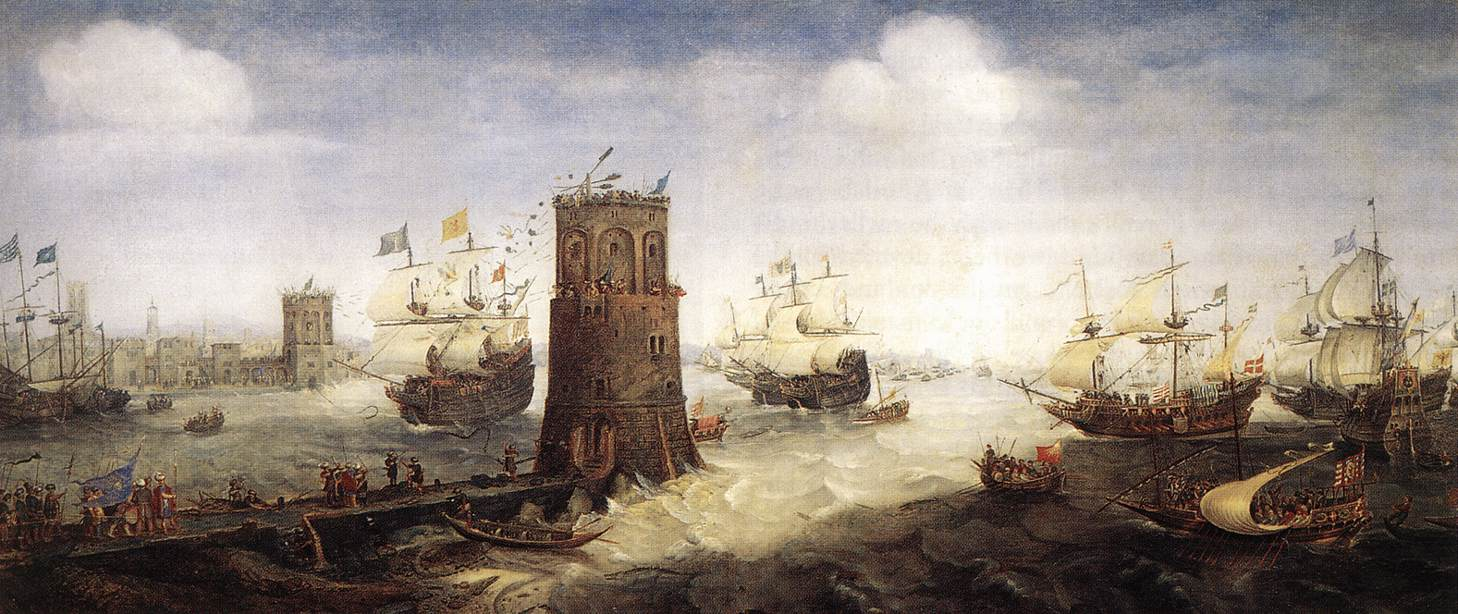
Crusaders break a chain protecting the harbour (at left) in the siege of Damietta.

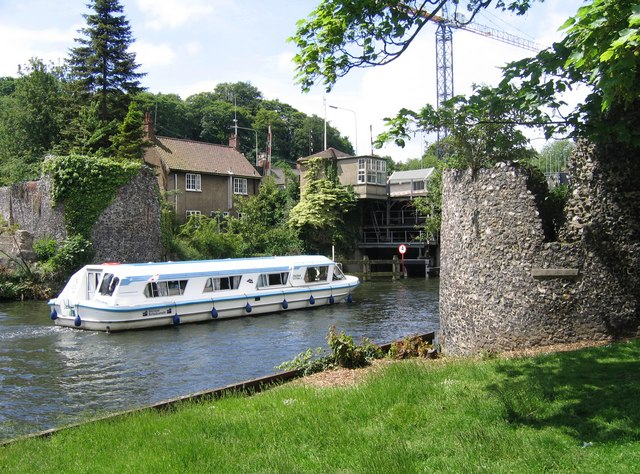
Boom towers in Norwich

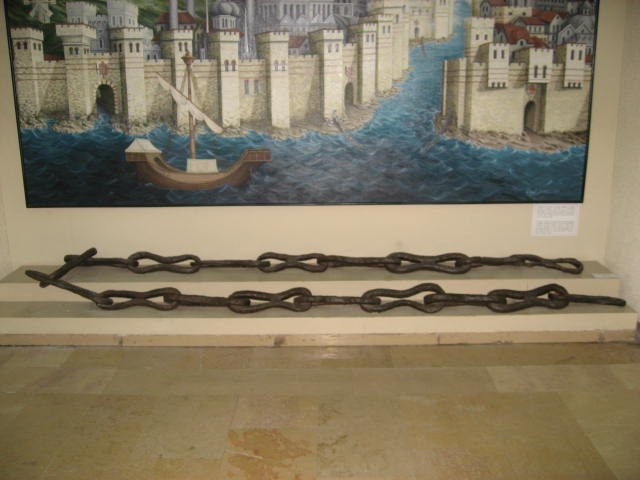
Remains of the great chain that protected the Golden Horn

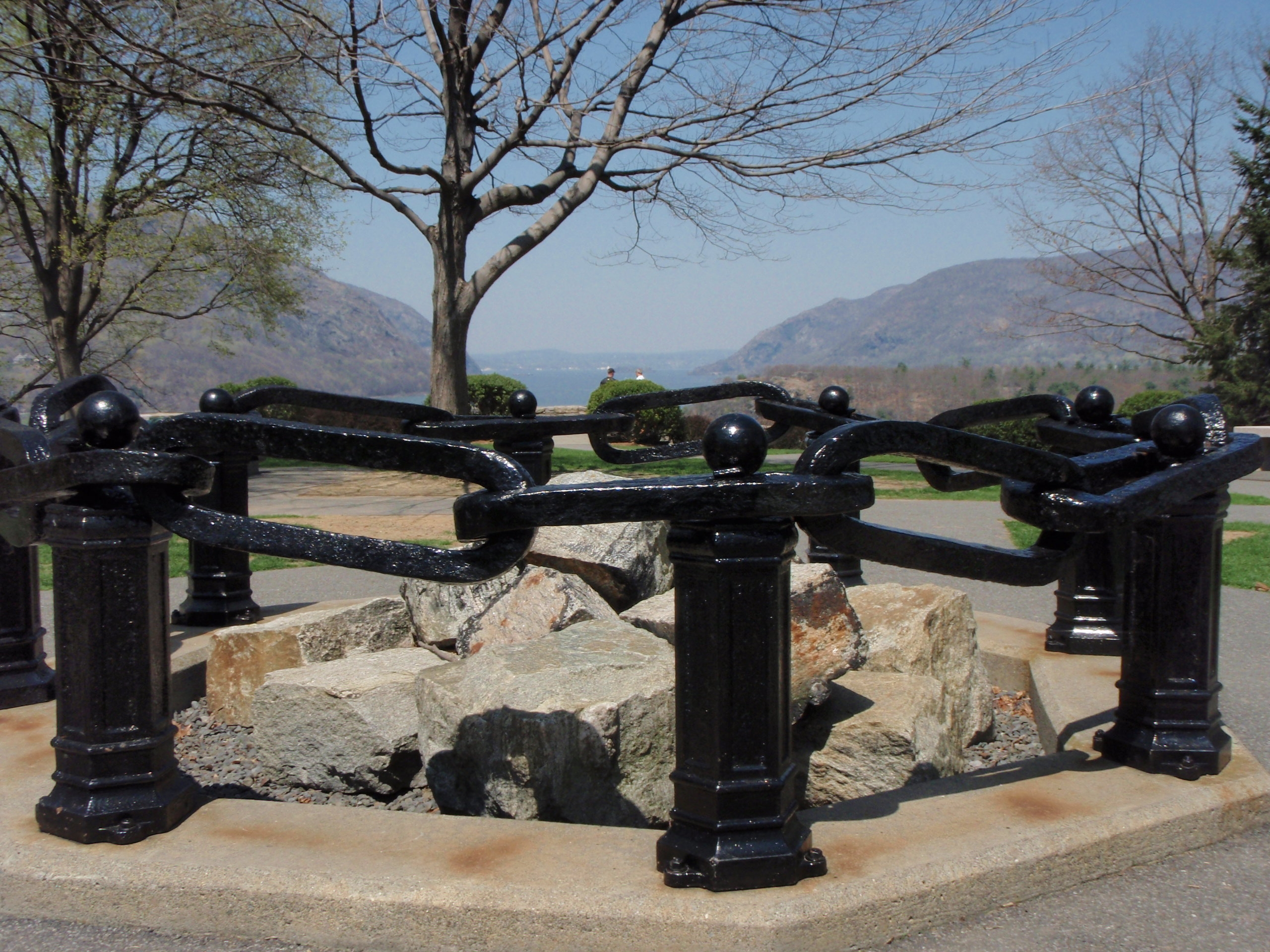
A preserved section of the Hudson River Chain

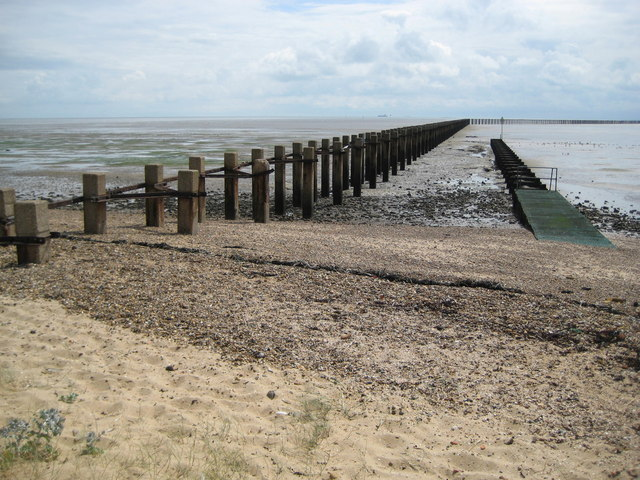
Remains of the Shoeburyness Boom, built to protect the Thames Estuary from Soviet submarines during the Cold War

== Examples ==
=== Historical ===
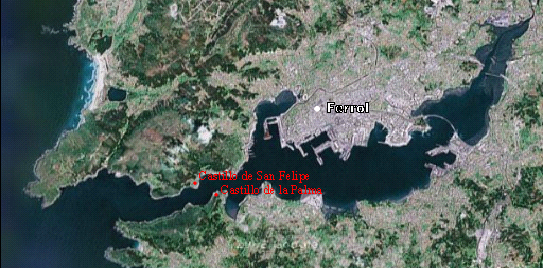
Defensive system for Ferrol, Spain, which proved to be useful against the Ferrol Expedition.

- The entrance to the Cothon at Carthage was protected by a chain.
- The chain at Fort Blockhouse, protecting Portsmouth Harbour from 1431 to 1539.
- The Leonine Wall included a chain blocking the Tiber
- A chain spanned the Golden Horn
- A chain and boom blocked the River Medway during the Raid on the Medway
- Hudson River Chain
- The chain blocking the Parana River during the Battle of Vuelta de Obligado
- A chain was placed from Columbus, Kentucky across the Mississippi River to Missouri in order to block Union ships during the American Civil War
- Between the A Palma Castle in Mugardos and Saint Philip Castle, in ria of Ferrol, to defend the city and naval base.

== See also ==
- Anti-submarine net
  - Boom defence vessel - a vessel charged with laying anti-submarine nets
- Log boom - a boom for collecting logs
- Boom (containment) - a boom for containing oil spills
- Pile barrage - an underwater fortification consisting of piles driven into the sea or river bed

== Notes ==
A. Some sources have the chain being dismantled instead of broken by a ship in the siege of Damietta and in the raid on the Medway.
