= Ria of Ferrol =

Coastal inlet in Galicia, Spain

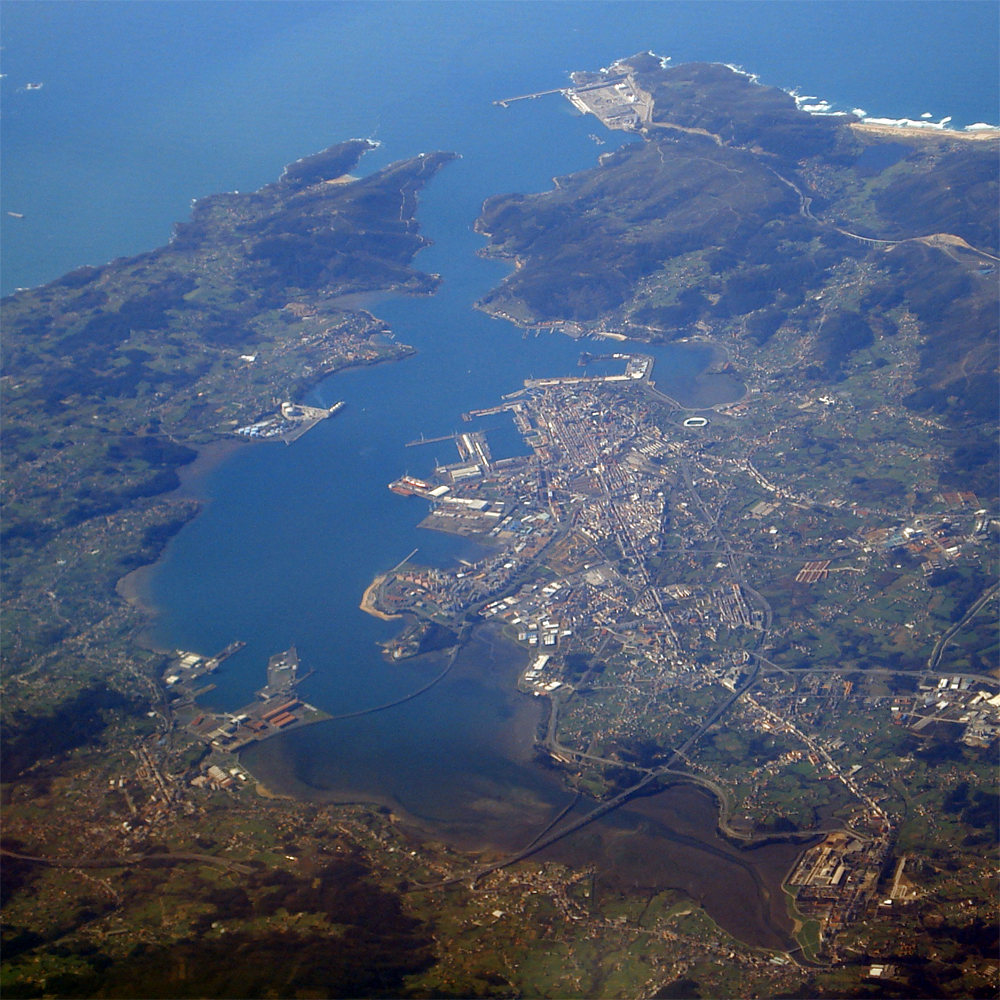

- Location within Galicia
- Coordinates: 43.4734°N 8.21851°W
- Type: Ria
- River sources: Xuvia River
- Ocean/sea sources: Atlantic Ocean
- Basin countries: Spain
- Settlements: Ferrol, Narón, Neda, Fene, Mugardos

The Ria of Ferrol (or Bay of Ferrol; Spanish and Galician: ría de Ferrol) is a ria in Galicia, Spain, the saline estuary of the Xuvia River. Located in the province of A Coruña, in the northwestern end of the Iberian Peninsula, it forms along the rías of A Coruña, Ares and Betanzos the gulf known as Portus Magnus Artabrorum in Roman times. An important harbour, it became a base of the Spanish Navy during the Habsburg dynasty, with the forts of San Felipe and La Palma watching over the in and out of the ria. Bordered by the municipalities of Ferrol, Narón, Neda, Fene, Mugardos, it stands out among the Galician rias in terms of the degree of alteration caused by human activities. Also featuring nonetheless a rich sealife, the bay of Ferrol (itself included within the so-called "Rías Altas") is exploited to obtain seafood, chiefly varieties of clam and cockle.
