= Shoeburyness Boom =

Defensive barrier in the Thames Estuary, England

Coordinates: 51.5271°N 0.8148°E

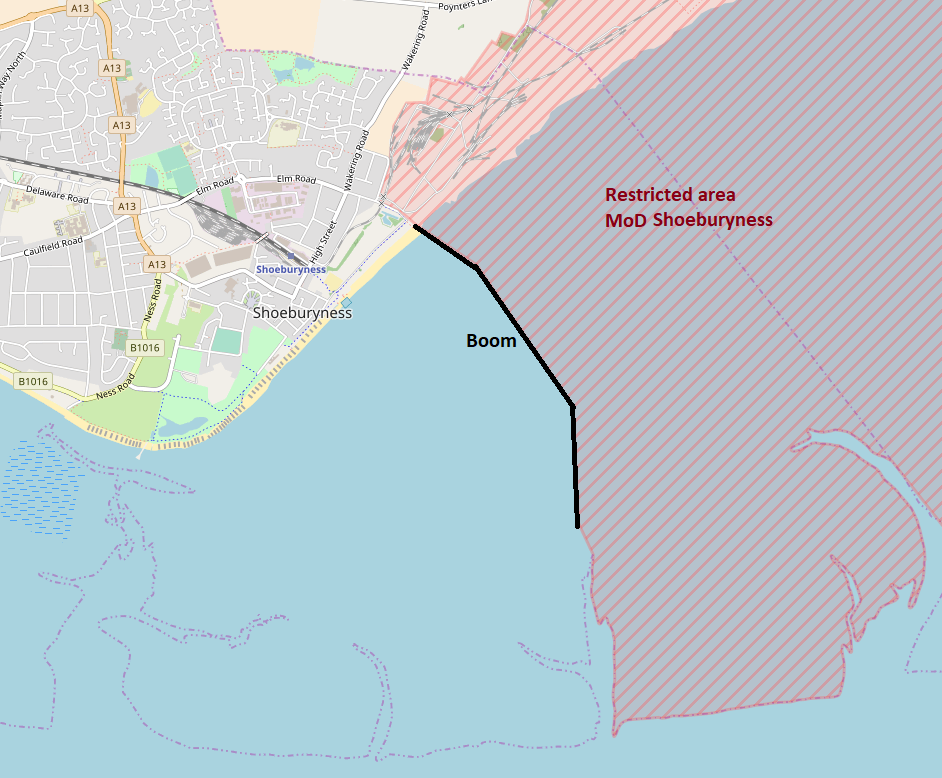
The remaining portion of the Cold War boom forms the shallow water boundary of the restricted area associated with MoD Shoeburyness

The Shoeburyness Boom (also known as the Sheerness Boom, Thames Boom or Thames Estuary Boom) refers to two successive coastal defence barriers across most of the Thames Estuary in the mid-20th century, consisting of floating booms and pile barrages. As to the part perpendicular to the north shore most of the latter incarnation remains, and its nearest concrete mooring/patrol point 600 metres south. A 2 km (2,200 yard) stretch, this is designated a scheduled monument and marks the western edge of MoD Shoeburyness firing range, a restricted area. The rest was taken up in the 1960s.

The first guise was built in late 1939, the first months of the Second World War, mainly to protect shipping and the capital from attack by submarines, mines and surface vessels. It was dismantled. The second was built between 1950 and 1953 to forestall access to the estuary by Soviet submarines during the Cold War.

Both booms ran most of the way from Shoeburyness in Essex to Sheerness in Kent: 5.6 miles (9.0 km). The first guise consisted of wooden piles driven into the estuary bed save for in the deep-water channel which was protected by an anti-submarine net. The second guise added concrete piles at either end of the gap (channel) able to assist Royal Navy vessels.

The development of nuclear missiles, jet bombers and the hydrogen bomb quickly rendered the Cold War boom obsolete and it was partially demolished in the 1960s.

== Second World War boom ==
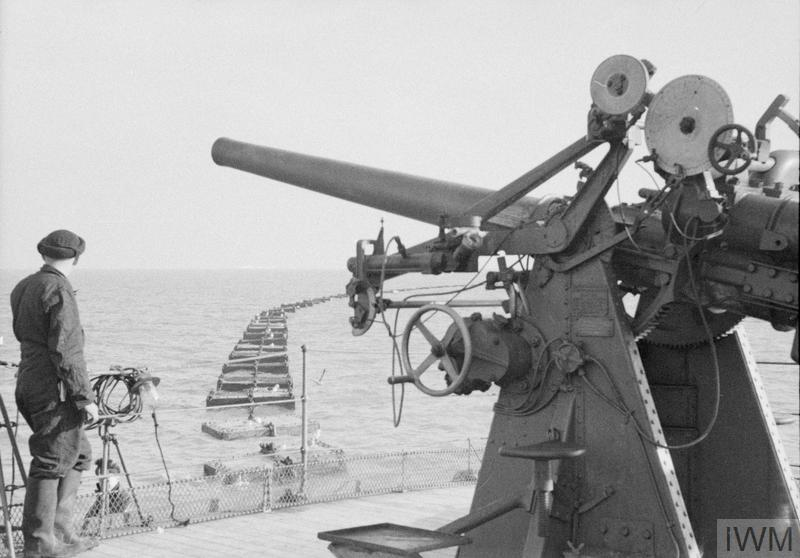
A 3" gun on a ship guarding one of the gates in the anti-submarine net

The boom was erected in 1939, at the start of the Second World War. The main intention was to prevent any incursion of enemy submarines up the estuary where they could attack merchant shipping. Secondary benefits included protection against floating mines, enemy surface vessels and to reduce the available invasion beachheads.

The boom ran apart from a minor gap for the navigation channel. Its north part ran from the East Beach at Shoeburyness, Essex. Its south part ran from Royal Oak Point in Sheerness, Kent thus most of the 5.6-mile (9-kilometre) span. In the shallow water at either end, closest to the land, the boom were pile barrages driven into the sandy seabed and reinforced with concrete. From the Essex (north) side these ran for over 1 mile (1.6 km).

Where the boom met the deep water channel it became an anti-submarine net. At intervals along the net 200-ton lighters were stationed armed with anti-aircraft guns and searchlights. Two gates were set in the net for access by shipping, one towards the north for access to the Thames and one towards the south for the Medway ports. These were opened by a Royal Navy boom defence vessel and closed overnight.

The boom was backed up by the nearby Maunsell Sea Forts and by a coastal battery/emplacement at Shoeburyness. The latter housed two 6" naval guns and search-light emplacements protected by landward defences. A second boom was placed across the mouth a little further west at Canvey Island. Similar protections were quickly installed at the Solent (to protect the ports of Southampton and Portsmouth) and at Plymouth.

The remains of Shoeburyness battery, together with its magazines and search-light emplacements are visible in the grounds of MoD Shoeburyness – with no public access. In the south are scant remnants: a line of piles and wrecked boats at East End, close to Minster Beach.

=== Gallery ===
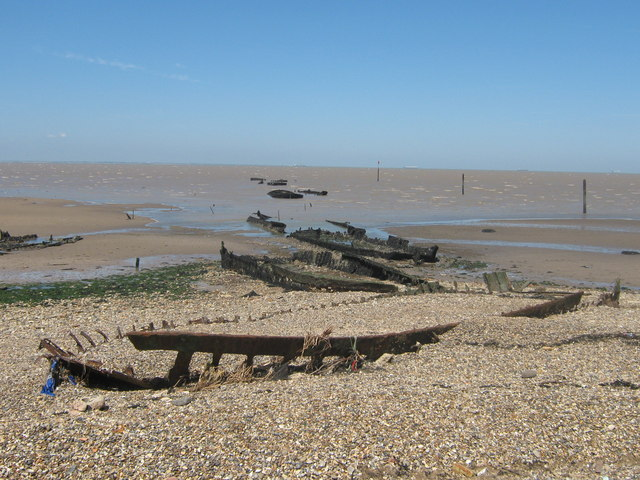
Remains of a pile barrage and wrecked boats at Royal Oak Point, East End.

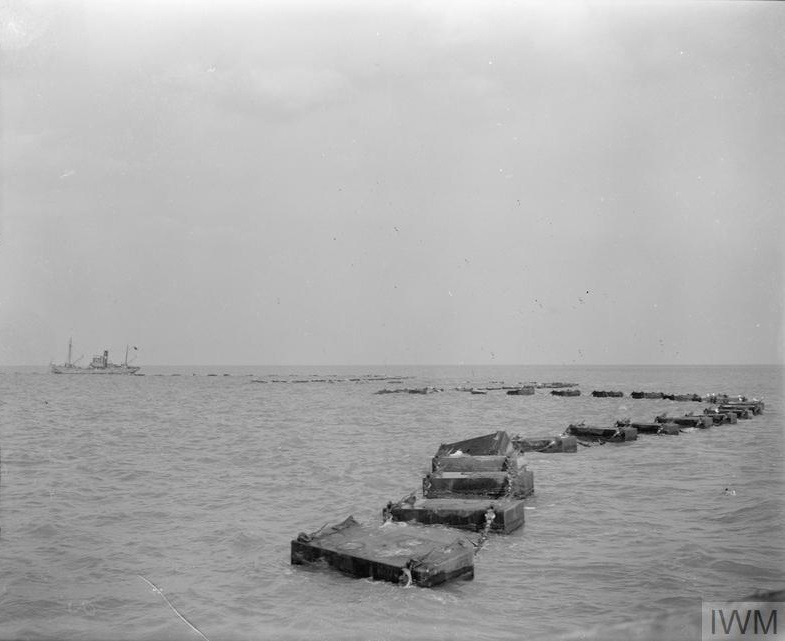
One of the gates in the boom

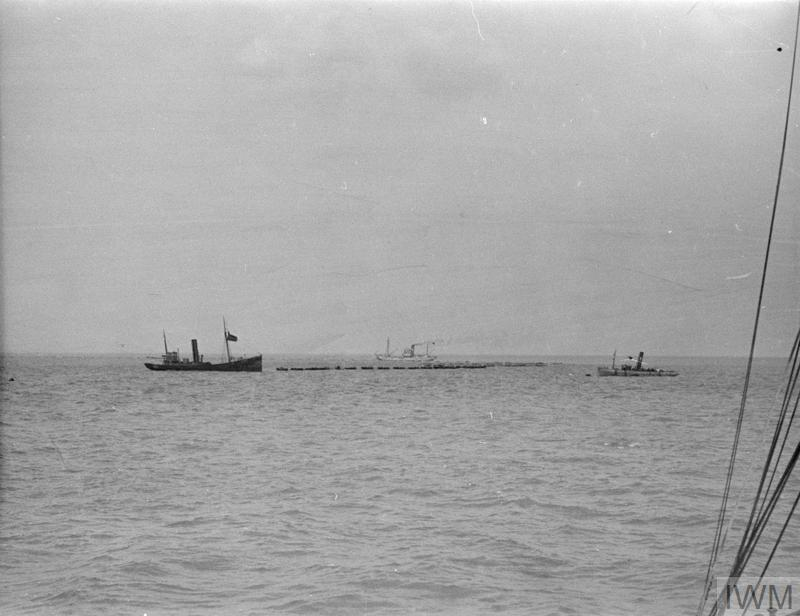
Boom defence vessels

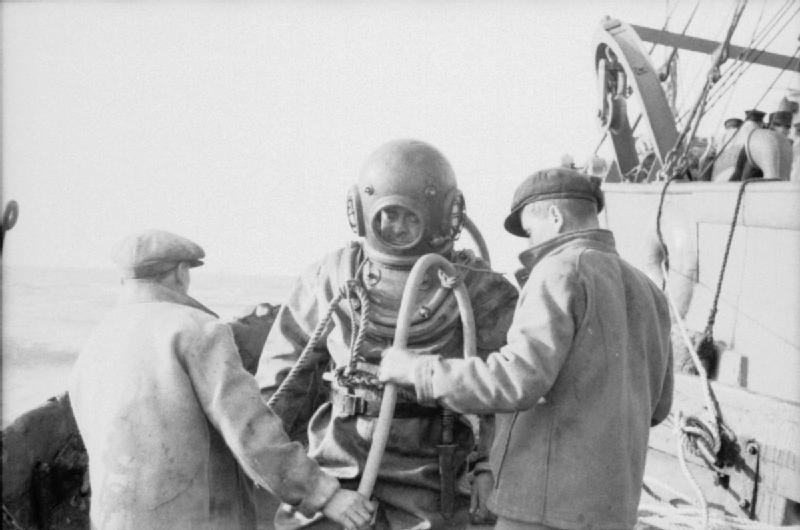
Royal Navy diver preparing to check the mooring lines of one of the gate ships

== Cold War boom ==
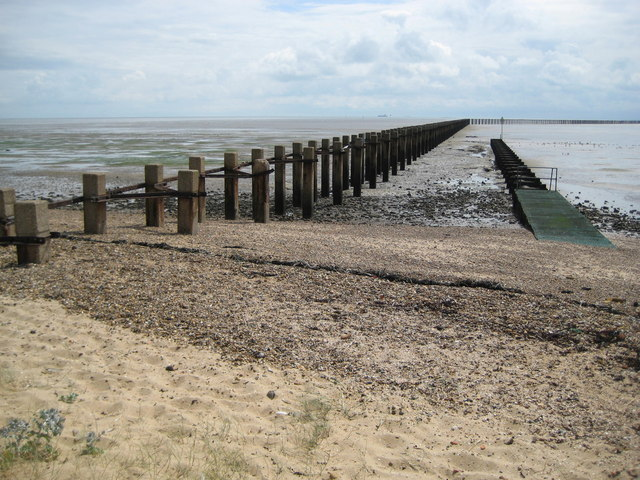
Remains of the Cold War boom. The structure on the right is an unrelated outfall pipe.

The replacement booms were built 15 to 60 m (16 to 65 yards) west of the old ones between 1950 and 1953 by labourers and servicemen for the Admiralty. These comprised two offset rows of concrete pile barrages, linked by angle-iron straps. The northern boom had two changes of direction along its length before meeting the deep water channel. In times of extreme alert the gap between the two was intended to be closed by moored Royal Navy vessels. By its final year the nature of the threat was shifting from submarines to nuclear-armed bombers against which the boom would have been scant defence. With the coming of reliable nuclear-armed rockets, jet-powered bombers and the hydrogen bomb in the mid-1950s the principle was beyond doubt obsolete. It is the only known anti-submarine boom of the Cold War.

In the 1960s the piles at the Kent (south) side were removed.

Those at the Essex (north) side have been shortened by 600 m (660 yards), leaving 2.01 km (2,200 yards) projecting from the shore. It has developed a few gaps from loss by erosion of a few piles. The post that marked the transition from the boom to the deep water anti-submarine net remains in the mid-north of the channel. The boom is a landmark on this stretch of coast. The structure marks the western boundary of the firing range at the MoD property (managed by Qinetiq) and access is not permitted to the beach beyond. It was granted scheduled monument status in 2004.

The remains of the boom and deep, broad channel post are Hazards on regional shipping charts. A modern navigation light with accompanying mooring bollards and accessway is at the broad channel post. On 25 July 2015 the boom was struck by an empty, drifting fishing vessel.

=== Gallery ===
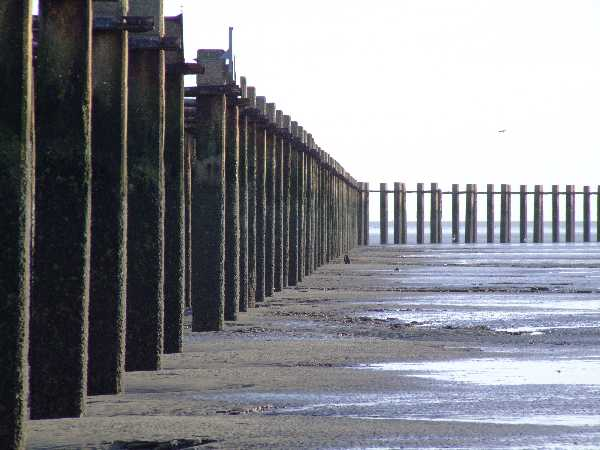
Detail of the first corner angle

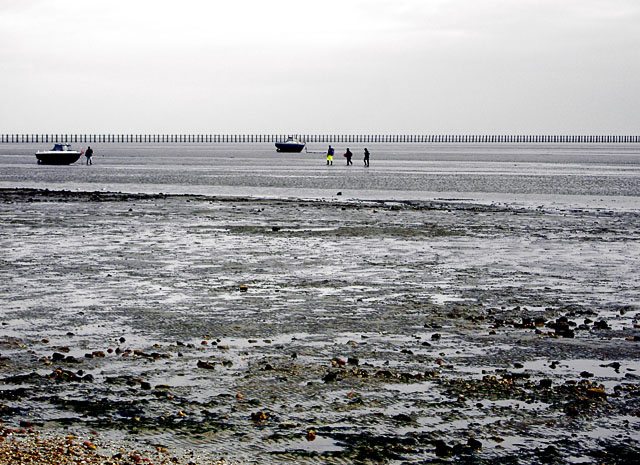
Showing some of the further reaches of the boom

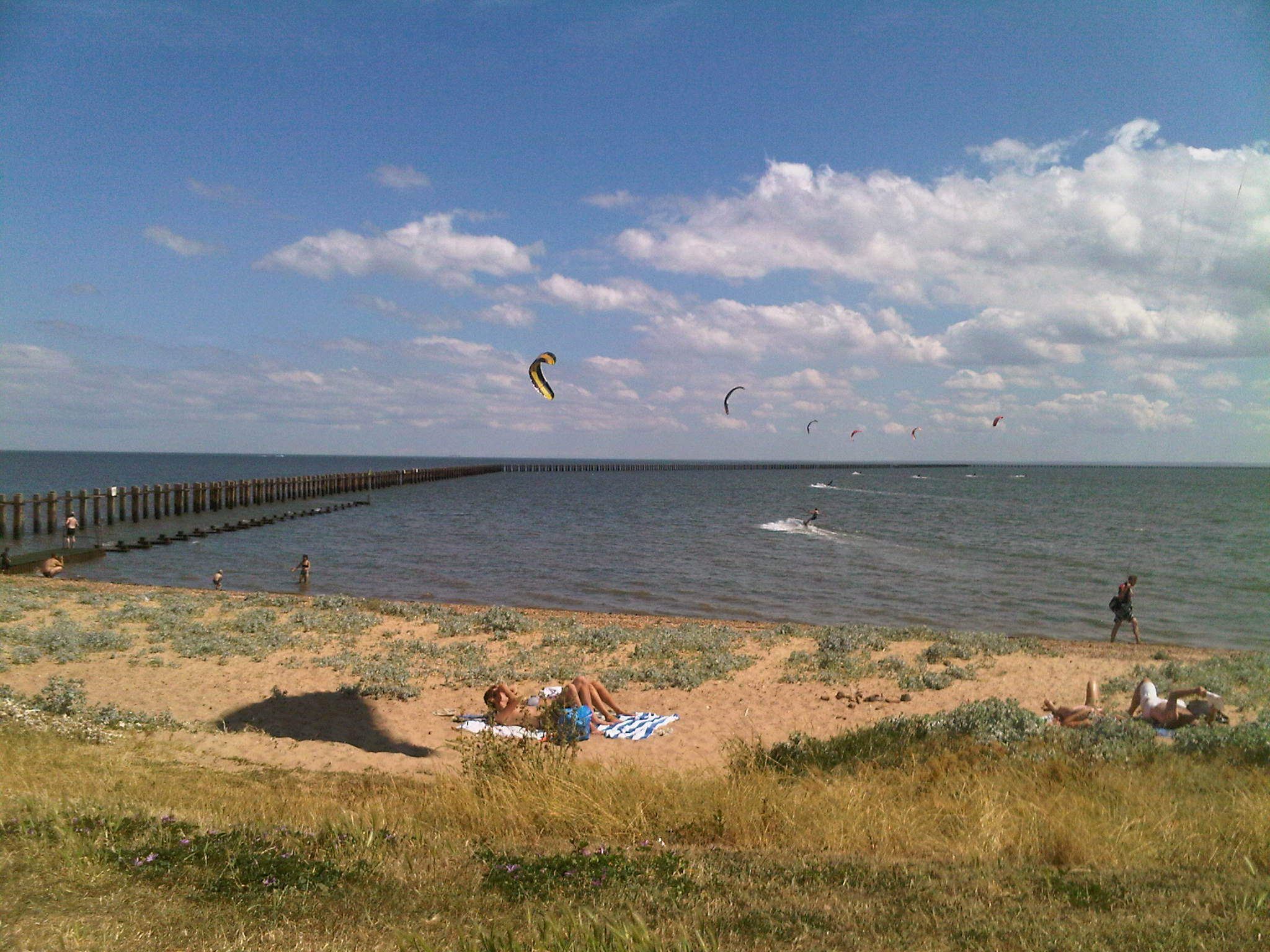
In context with public use of the beach

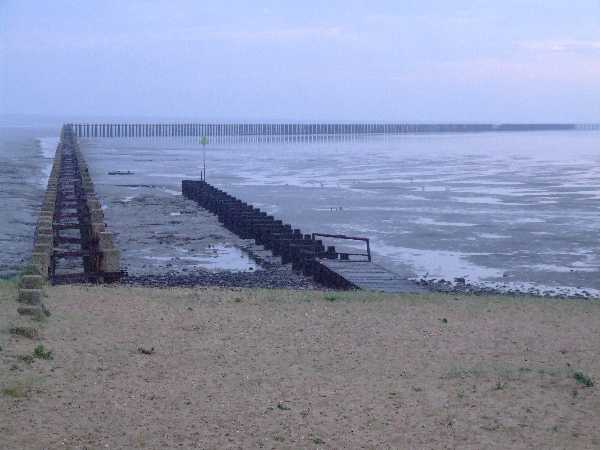
View along the boom

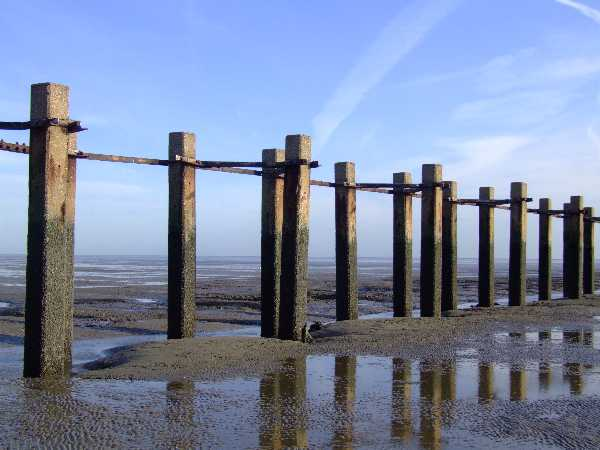
Close up of one of the boom's a pile barrages
