= Amada García =

Galician Communist activist

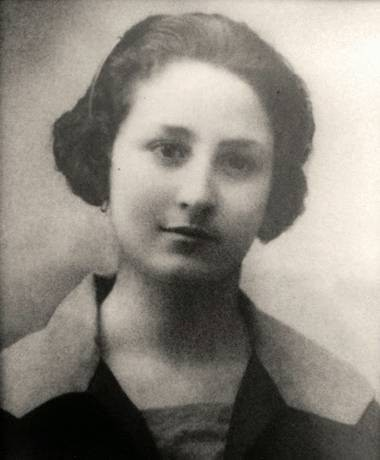
Amada García Rodríguez

Amada García Rodriguez (Mugardos, 1911 – Ferrol, 1938) was a Galician Communist activist. She lived in the Galician village of Mugardos. She was arrested while pregnant, and after she gave birth she was shot along with seven other people at St Philip's Castle by Francoist military forces during the Spanish Civil War.

== Woman, youth and communist activist ==
Amada García was a Communist Party young activist in Mugardos, near Ferrol, in Galicia. Enrolled in politics, she took part in political meetings and in other activities ordinarily not carried out by women, and this caused a shocking effect in the most conservative groups in the village in the 1930s.

== Uprising and illegal repression ==
In 1936, under Franco's leadership, falangists and military fascists took over Galicia after a failed coup to overthrown the central government in Madrid. They imposed a heavy repression, especially in the Ferrol region. Several hundred people died and went missing here without trial, or with a sham trial done to punish leftist political activities.

== Arrest and death of Amada García ==
Amada was arrested when she was pregnant. Thereby, the court-martial and subsequent execution was delayed until after the birth. While waiting for the child's birth, she was imprisoned in the Women's Prison in Ferrol. Afterwards, she was taken to St Phillip's Castle, a military prison on the shores of Ferrol bay. There she was shot, the day after she gave birth, by a firing squad on January 27, 1938, along with seven other persons, at the castle wall and her son was later raised by catholic nuns . The others' names are Juan José Teixeiro Leira, José Maria Montero Martínez, Ángel Roldos Gelpi, and Antonio Eitor Caniça, from Mugardos; Ramón Rodrigues Lopes e Jaime Gonçales Peres, from Ares; and Germán Lopes García, from Cabanas.

The court-martial was filled with irregularities: false testimony signed without knowing by an illiterate witness, and death threats and fines to the witness for the defense. Oral sources said that there was a solidarity movement among the prisoners in order to avoid the young activist's execution, and even the soldiers had to shoot twice, because they missed with the first volley. She still stood and the officer ordered, very angrily, to shoot the woman, who fell fatally wounded.

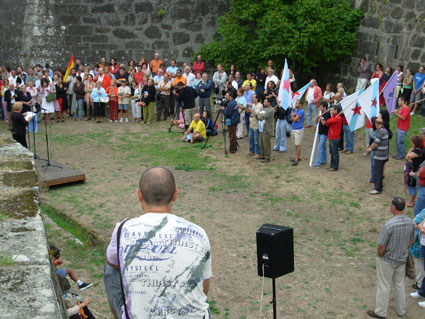
Part-view of St Phillip's Castle, in Ferrol, where Amada was executed. Tribute to the victims of franquism in August 2006.

== Amada García in Galician historical memory ==
Her daughter became a nun, and her minor son, Gabriel, was initially given to his father, but finally was brought up by three very Catholic aunts. Amada's sister shut herself up in the Eiris Monastery. A good friend of her mother, Maria José Leira, was condemned to death, but later left Galicia after a commutation. She was condemned for embroidering a communist flag, and her husband, a school-teacher, had been executed a short time before.

Nowadays, Amada's son, Gabriel, pays visits to the wall of the castle where his mother was executed. He continues to denounce his mother's execution. He also works to spread awareness of his mother's story, and the lack of political commitment to the victims of fascism in Galicia.

== Bibliography ==
- BARRERA BEITIA, Enrique: Ferrol, 1931–1952. De la república a la posguerra. Edicións Embora, Ferrol, Galiza, 2005.
- VELASCO SOUTO, Carlos: Represión e alzamento militar en Galiza. A Nosa Terra, Vigo, Galiza, 2006.
