= Valdoviño =

- municipality
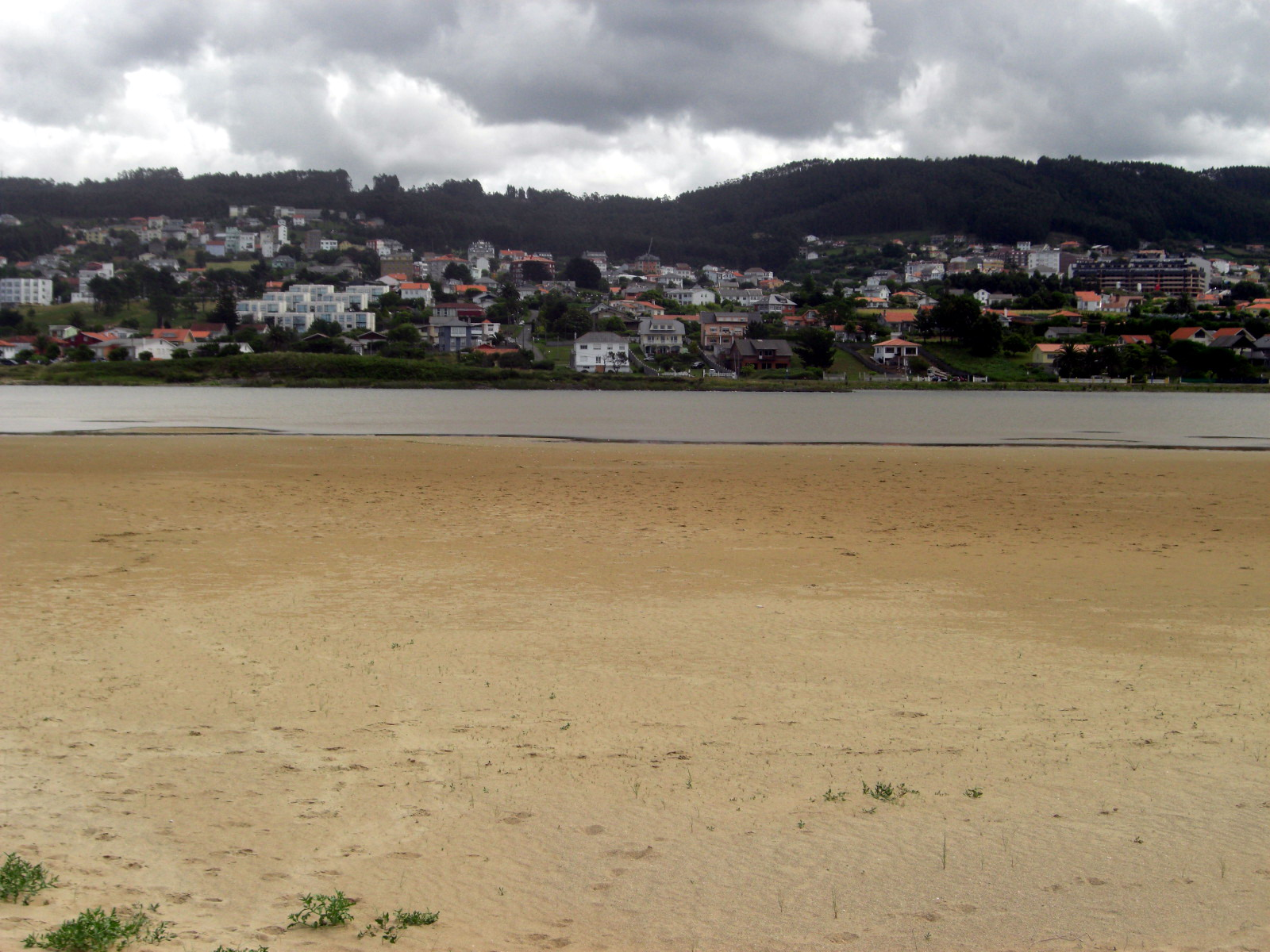

- Coat of arms

- Location in Spain
- Coordinates: 43°36′00″N 8°7′59″W
- Country: Spain
- Autonomous community: Galicia
- Province: A Coruña
- Comarca: Ferrol

Government
  - Mayor: María Isabel Álvarez Diéguez

Area
  - Total: 88.52 km^{2} (34.18 sq mi)
- Elevation: 243 m (797 ft)

Population (2025-01-01)
  - Total: 6,818
  - Density: 77.02/km^{2} (199.5/sq mi)
- Demonym: Valdoviñés
- Postal code: 15550
- Website: Official website

Valdoviño is a municipality in the province of A Coruña in the autonomous community of Galicia in northwestern Spain. It is located in the comarca of Ferrol. Valdoviño has a population of 6,926 inhabitants (INE, 2011).

== Geography ==
The granite coast of Valdoviño is home to several sandy beaches, a large lagoon and a lighthouse.

== Parroquias ==
There are eight parroquias:

- Lago (Santiago)
- Loira (San Pedro)
- Meirás (San Vicente)
- Pantín (Santiago)
- O Sequeiro (Santa María)
- Valdoviño (Santalla)
- Vilaboa (San Vicente)
- Vilarrube (San Martiño)

== See also ==
- Ferrolterra
- Fragas do Eume
- List of municipalities in A Coruña
