= Mugardos =

Real Vila de Mugardos
- Borough and Municipality
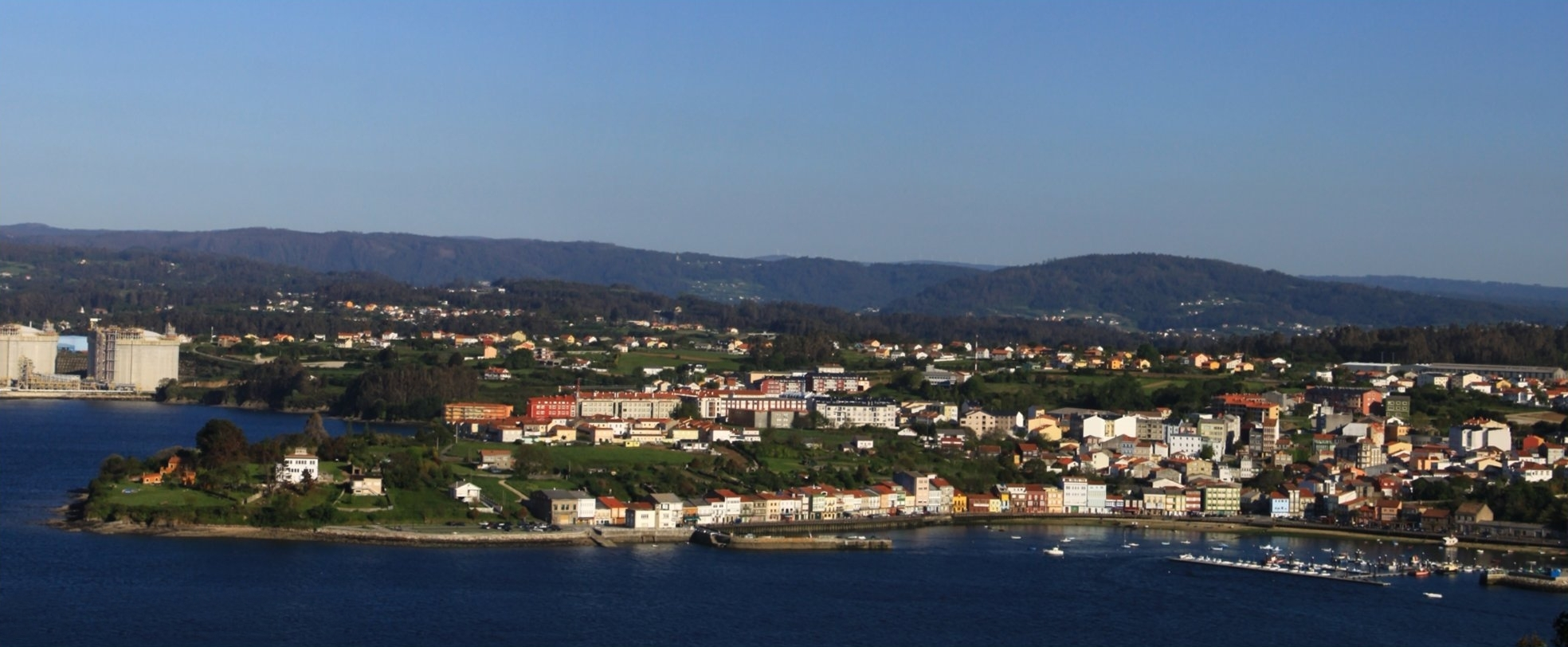

- Flag Coat of arms

- Location in Spain
- Coordinates: 43°27′16″N 8°14′9″W
- Country: Spain
- Autonomous community: Galicia
- Province: A Coruña
- Comarca: Ferrol

Government
  - Mayor: Juan Domingo de Deus Fonticoba (PPdG)

Area
  - Total: 12.77 km^{2} (4.93 sq mi)
- Elevation: 2 m (6.6 ft)

Population (2025-01-01)
  - Total: 5,203
  - Density: 407.4/km^{2} (1,055/sq mi)
- INE
- Time zone: UTC+1 (CET)
  - Summer (DST): UTC+2 (CEST)
- Website: Official website

Mugardos is a small fishing borough and municipality in the comarca of Ferrol, located in the province of A Coruña in the autonomous community of Galicia, northwestern Spain. It is bordered with the municipalities of Ares and Fene.

== Climate ==
Due to its proximity to the Atlantic Ocean, Mugardos does not enjoy extreme oscillation in its weather conditions between winter and summer. The summers tend to be a bit drier than the winters, but the weather is mild all year round unlike most other parts of the Iberian Peninsula. Like the rest of Galicia, it is rainy and green.

== Description and history ==
The municipality comprises the main township of Mugardos, and several smaller villages. It is part of the historical comarca of Ferrolterra, and is situated near the metropolitan outskirts of the city of Ferrol. The municipality is subdivided into four parroquias ("parishes"): Santiago de Franza, San Vicente de Meá, San Xulián de Mugardos and San Xoán de Piñeiro.

During the 1960s and 1970s Mugardos was much larger than it is now, it included a movie theatre and was regarded as a summer visiting place for many Spaniards in the surrounding areas. Recently, however, it has undergone drastic changes. It is now very small and with the recent oil spills the coastal fishing industry consisting mainly of cockle pickers has temporarily declined, even though a rise in tourism is expected soon, especially with the creation of several new lodgings.

One of the most historic places in Mugardos is the A Palma Castle, which is a military fortress standing on the southern bank of the Bay of Ferrol. The castle was built in 1597 with its original name being "Nuestra Señora de la Palma" (Our Lady of the Palm) and later reformed in 1869. When it was built, the castle was merely used as a "watch tower" but later when it was reformed and became a crucial part of the defensive system of the estuary of Ferrol. Facing the castle is "Castelo de San Filipe" (Castle of Saint Philip) which forms the other part of the defensive system. These two castles are adjoined by a large and sturdy chain that was used to prevent the entrance of enemy ships. Later, the castle was also used as a military prison where the most famous prisoner, Antonio Tejero, was held captive. Tejero was responsible for the attempted coup de etat in 1981. Recently, the Palm Castle has been bought by a hotel chain and is pending restoration.

== Culture and Gastronomy ==
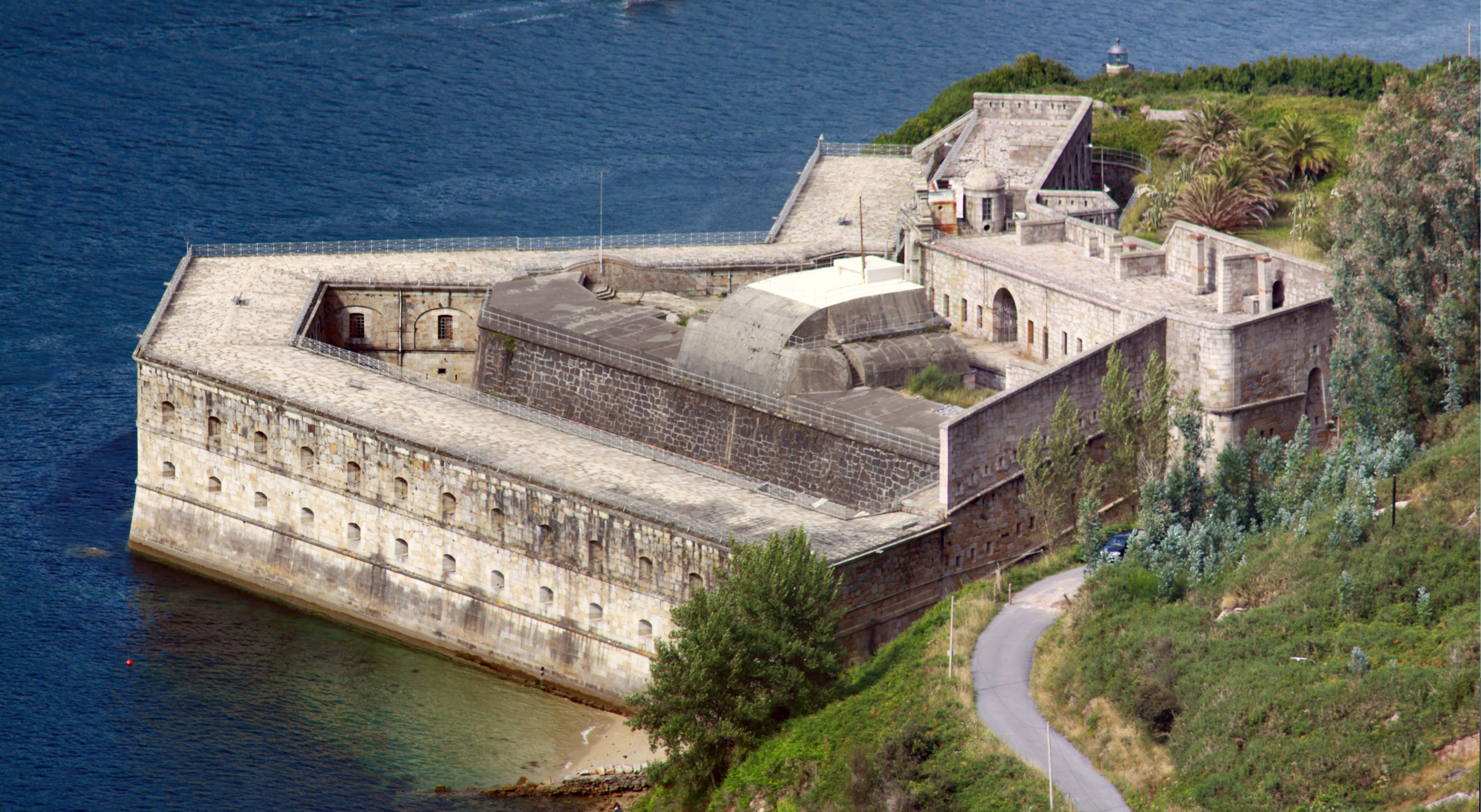
The "A Palma" Castle

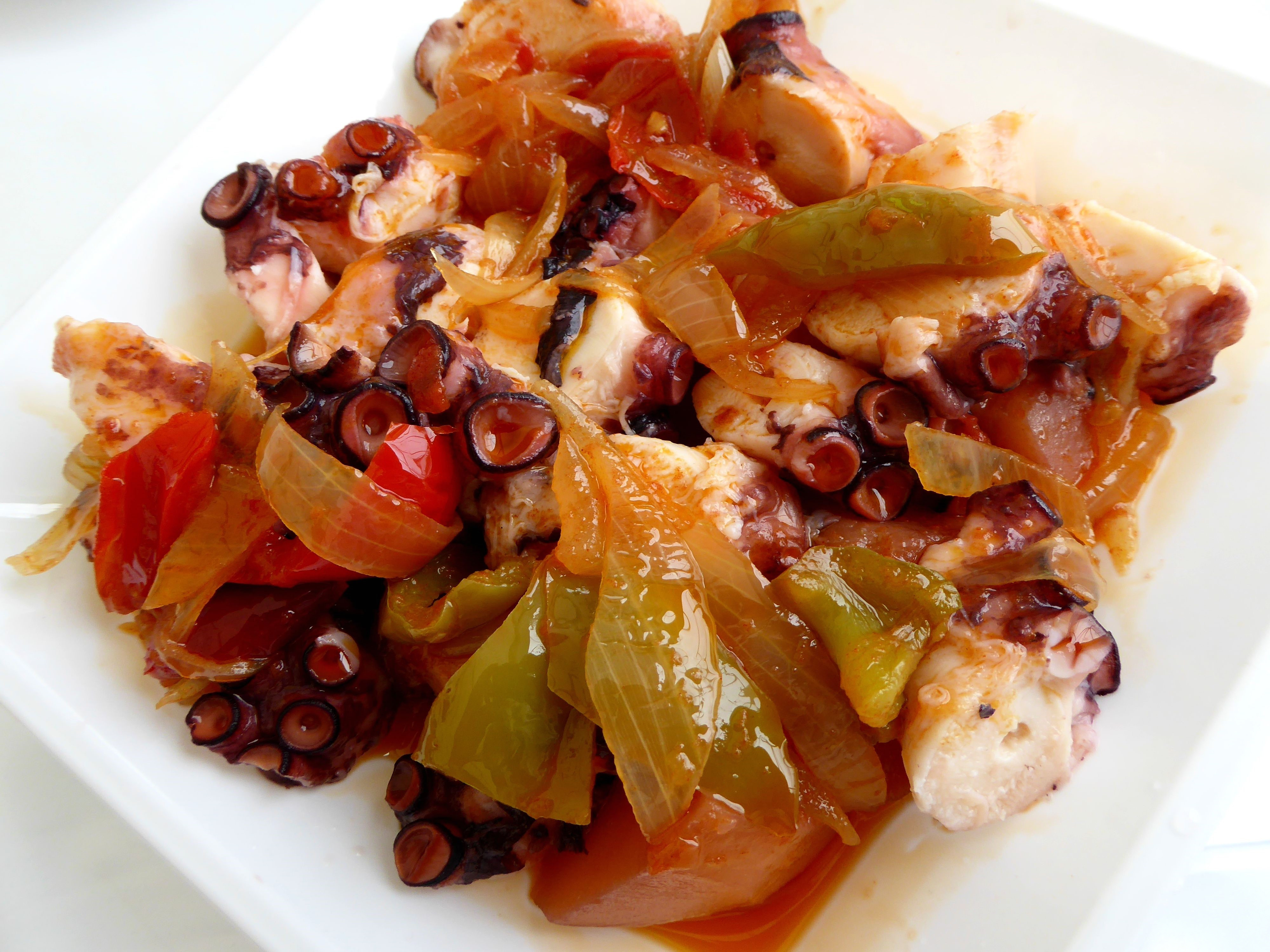
Local octopus stew, also known as "Pulpo a la Mugardesa"

=== Festivals ===
- Fiesta de La Virgen del Carmen: The Carmen Festival is celebrated the weekend of 16 July, the day of Our Lady of Mount Carmel. On this day there is a ceremony and procession where men hold up the statue of Our Lady and walk her down from the main parish church until the harbour, where they embark it on a traditional boat, to continue the procession by sailing.
- Fiesta del Pulpo: The Octopus Festival is celebrated the Saturday before the Carmen festival. On this day Octopus stew is prepared using a recipe that Mugardos is famous for, "Pulpo a la Mugardesa" and many tourists and town folks join in the festivities from morning until night with musical groups and flea markets.
- Dia de San Julian: Saint Julian's day, 7 January, is the Patron saint of the town.

== Economy ==
Mugardos is a predominantly rural borough, though important industries like shipyards, foundries, and workshops are to be found in nearby Ferrol. Fishing, farming, agriculture and services are the main local industries.

Due to the economic crisis that has stricken the country and town's economy for the past few years, more than 60 shops in the town started accepting in 2011 the obsolete Spanish currency of peseta, accepting it alongside its replacement, the 2002-introduced euro.

== Notable residents ==
- Teresa Cameselle (born 1968), Spanish writer of romantic novels and historical narratives
- Amada García (1911 – 1938), Galician Communist activist.

== See also ==
List of municipalities in A Coruña
