= Moeche =

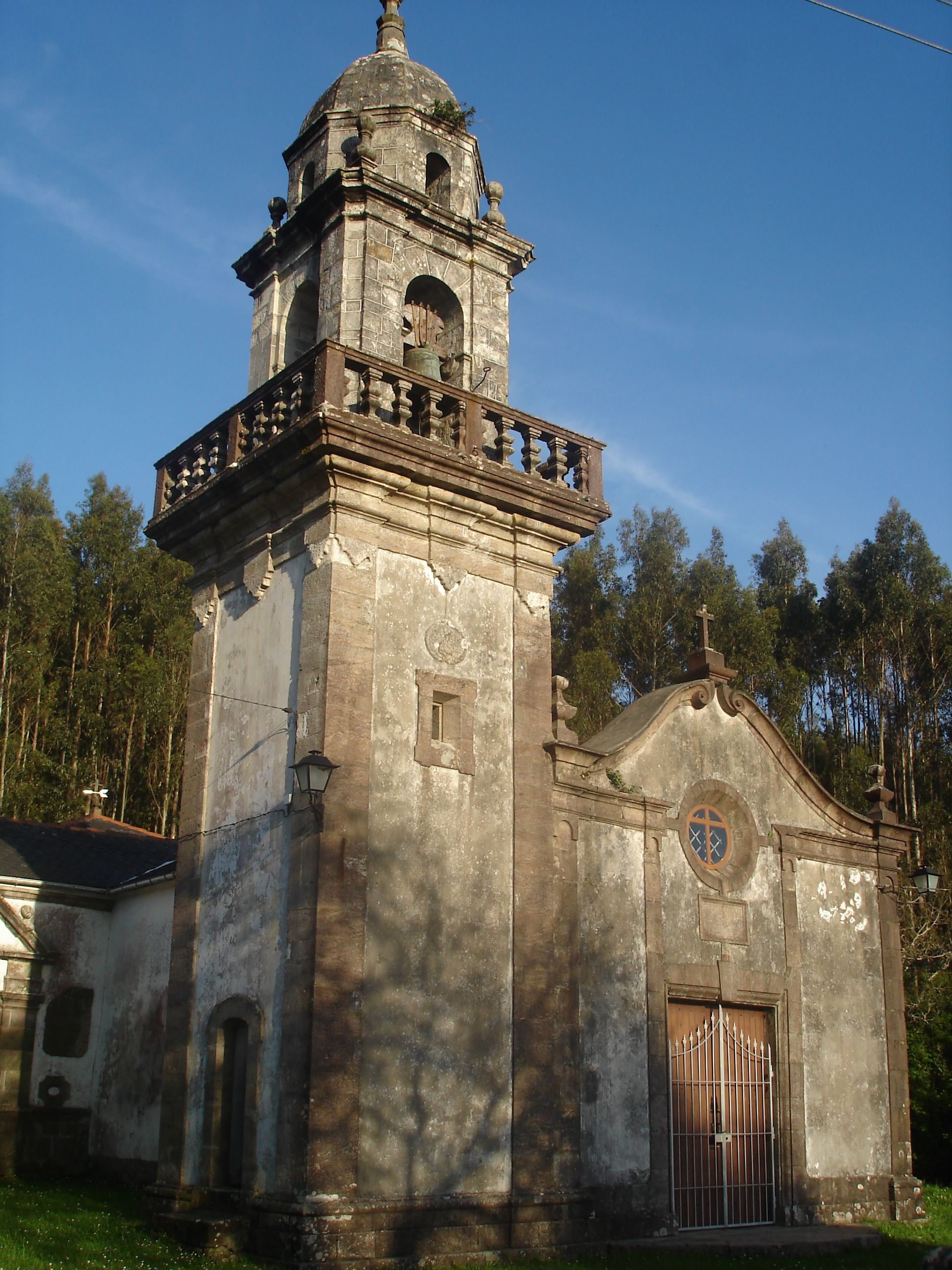
- Parish church of San Xurxo de Moeche.

- Flag Coat of arms

- Location in Spain.
- Coordinates: 43°35′N 7°57′W
- Country: Spain
- Autonomous community: Galicia
- Province: A Coruña
- Comarca: Ferrol

Government
  - Mayor: Julio López Romeo

Area
  - Total: 48.50 km^{2} (18.73 sq mi)

Population (2025-01-01)
  - Total: 1,194
  - Density: 24.62/km^{2} (63.76/sq mi)
- Demonym: Modestinos
- Time zone: UTC+1 (CET)
  - Summer (DST): UTC+2 (CEST)

Moeche is a municipality in the province of A Coruña in the autonomous community of Galicia in northwestern Spain. It belongs to the comarca of Ferrol. It is home to a 14th-century castle, in the parish of San Xurxo. It has a square plan, with an 18 m-tall keep.

== See also ==
- List of municipalities in A Coruña
