= Teresa Cameselle =

Spanish writer

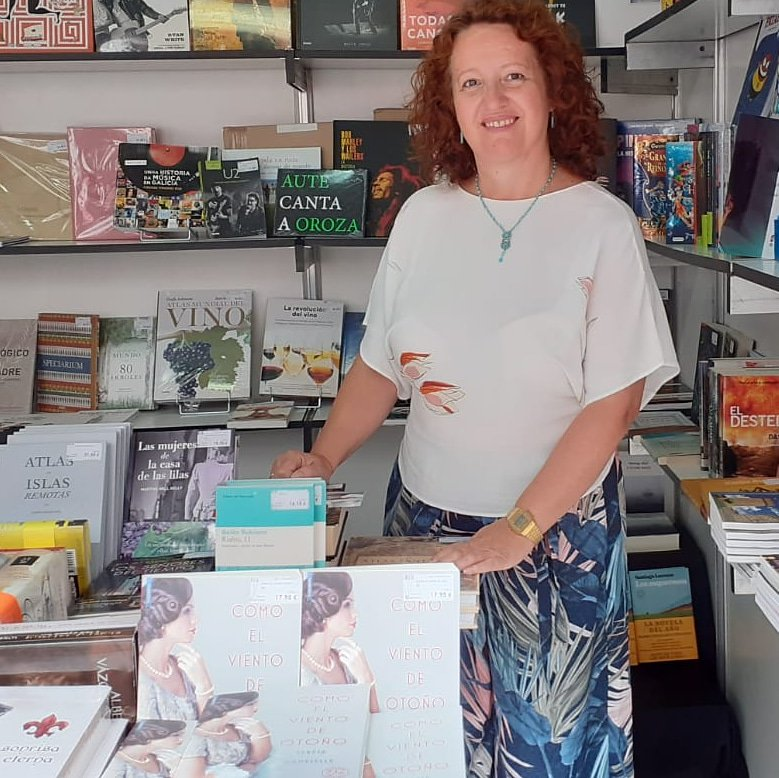
- Cameselle in 2020
- Born: María Teresa Cameselle Rodríguez; 1968 (age 57–58); Mugardos, A Coruña, Spain
- Occupation: writer
- Writing career
- Language: Spanish
- Genres: romance; narrative history
- Notable awards: Galardón Letras del Mediterráneo
- Website: www.teresacameselle.com

Teresa Cameselle (born 1968) is a Spanish Galician writer specialized in romantic novels and historical narratives.

== Biography ==
María Teresa Cameselle Rodríguez was born in Mugardos, Ferrol region of A Coruña, in 1968.

She began her career participating in short story competitions, where she won several awards and was published in anthologies. In 2008, she was a finalist for the La Voz de Galicia Novel Prize. Also in 2008, she won the Talismán Prize for Romantic Novels with her first full-length novel, La hija del cónsul (The Consul's Daughter), which was published the same year. Her professional relationship with literature also leads her to teach workshops, organize reading clubs, and offer a romantic novel course at the Association of New Writers. She has been a speaker at various literary conferences and events. After publishing twelve novels, in 2020, she received the "Galardón Letras del Mediterráneo" (Mediterranean Letters Award) from the Castelló Provincial Council for her career in romantic novels. Other notable titles include, No todo fue mentira (Not Everything Was a Lie), El mapa de tus sueños (The Map of Your Dreams), and No soy la bella durmiente (I Am Not Sleeping Beauty).

== Awards and honours ==
- 2006, Finalist, VII Acuman Short Story Competition
- 2007, dramatic story finalist, La Voz de Galicia Serial Novel Prize
- 2007, winner, La hija del cónsul, I Talismán Romantic Novel Prize
- 2008, "El fondo del pozo" (The Bottom of the Well), short story, second prize, XIX Torrente Ballester Narrative Course
- 2020, "Galardón Letras del Mediterráneo" (Mediterranean Letters Award)

== Selected works ==
- La hija del cónsul (2008-2015), Harper Collins
- No todo fue mentira (Espejismo - Inesperado - Coral) (2010), Editorial Planeta
- El mapa de tus sueños (2012), Phoebe - Pamies
- No soy la Bella Durmiente (2014), Phoebe - Pamies - Nueva edición (2023) - Amazon
- Quimera (2015), Ediciones B - Random House - 2020 Lantia Publishing
- La decisión de Blanca (2016), Harper Collins
- La pesadilla del sultán (2018), Harper Collins
- El maestro de piano (2017), KDP
- Como el viento de otoño (2019), Libros de Seda
- No me llames Cenicienta (2019), Terciopelo - Roca - Nueva edición (2024) Amazon
- Si te quedas en Morella (2020), Libros de Seda
- Ramyeon para dos - Antología Varias Autoras (2021), Amazon
- Como por arte de magia - Antología Varias Autoras (2021), Amazon
- Tú eres quien me ilumina - Varias Autoras (2022), Amazon
- Noches sin luna (2023), Amazon
- El próximo verano en Seúl (2024), Amazon
