= Ferrol (comarca) =

Coordinates: 43°31′24″N 8°07′22″W

- Comarca
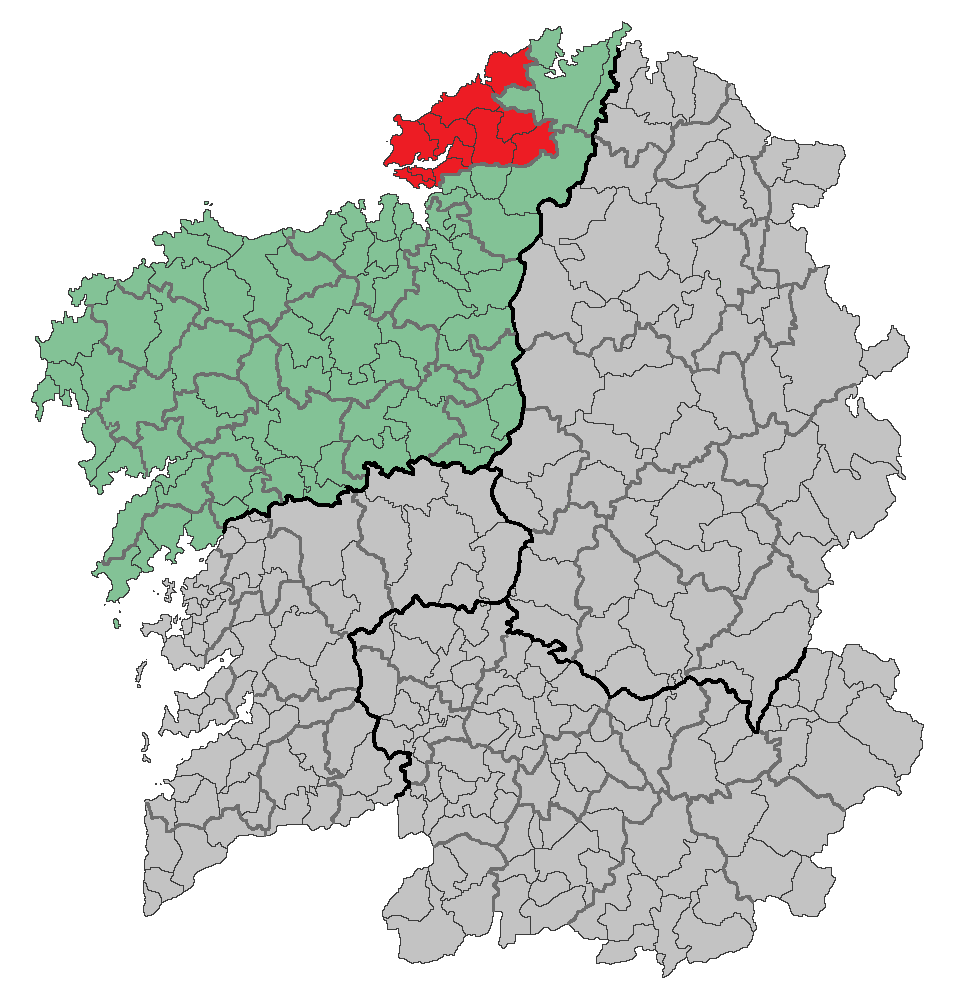
- Country: Spain
- Autonomous community: Galicia
- Province: A Coruña
- Capital: Ferrol
- Municipalities: List: Ares, Cedeira, Fene, Ferrol, Moeche, Mugardos, Narón, Neda, As Somozas, San Sadurniño, Valdoviño

Area
  - Total: 613.4 km^{2} (236.8 sq mi)

Population (2018)
  - Total: 153,776
  - Density: 250.7/km^{2} (649.3/sq mi)
- Demonym: Ferrolanos
- Time zone: UTC+1 (CET)
  - Summer (DST): UTC+2 (CEST)

Ferrol is a coastal comarca in the northwest of the province of A Coruña, Galicia, Spain. It is also known as Ferrolterra. The area is 613.4 km^{2}, and the overall population of this comarca was 161,154 at the 2011 Census; the latest official estimate (at the start of 2018) was 153,776.

== Municipalities ==
It is composed of 11 municipalities, two of which are considered cities (Ferrol and Narón).

Six municipalities (Ferrol, Ares, Fene, Mugardos, Narón and Neda) provide the urban division of the comarca as they form the urban area located around Ferrol Bay. These towns are very dependent on Ferrol and Narón and are closely connected between themselves.

The more rural zone to the east and north consists of Valdoviño, Moeche, Somozas and San Sadurniño municipalities. Finally the area of Cedeira, which forms a small zone by itself along the north coast, has much in common with the Ortegal Comarca to its east.

| Name of municipality | Population (2001) | Population (2011) | Population (2018) |
|---|---|---|---|
| Ferrol | 77,950 | 71,690 | 66,799 |
| Ares | 5,003 | 5,774 | 5,671 |
| Fene | 14,496 | 13,807 | 13,013 |
| Mugardos | 5,718 | 5,472 | 5,307 |
| Narón | 32,204 | 39,074 | 39,115 |
| Mugardos | 5,718 | 5,472 | 5,307 |
| Total Urban | 141,089 | 141,289 | 135,212 |
| Valdoviño | 6,805 | 6,873 | 6,613 |
| Moeche | 1,489 | 1,358 | 1,226 |
| Somozas | 1,396 | 1,281 | 1,103 |
| San Sadurniño | 3,220 | 3,085 | 2,828 |
| Cedeira | 7,500 | 7,268 | 6,794 |
| Total Rural | 20,410 | 19,865 | 18,564 |
| Total Combined | 161,499 | 161,154 | 153,776 |
