= A Map of Home =

2008 novel by Randa Jarrar

- Author: Randa Jarrar
- Language: English
- Published: 2008
- Publisher: The Penguin Group
- Publication place: United States

A Map of Home is a 2008 novel by Randa Jarrar. The book tells the life of a girl named Nidali, the feminine version of Nidal, which means "struggle". A Map of Home is a coming-of-age tale, telling the story of Nidali's life in Kuwait, Egypt, and the United States.

Set during the 1990 invasion of Kuwait with the Palestinian-Israeli conflict as a larger backdrop, the novel depicts the struggles of Nidali and her family, exploring the question of what "home" means, and the character's identity.

== Background information ==
A Map of Home is set in Palestinian-Israeli conflict, specifically during the Gulf War. The story is first set in Kuwait, then Egypt, and ends in Texas. There is political, cultural, and social turmoil throughout Kuwait, when eventually Saddam Hussein invades Kuwait in 1990. This forces the family to flee to Egypt. The author, Randa Jarrar, grew up in Kuwait and Egypt, moving to America soon after the Gulf War; This story is loosely autobiographical. A Map of Home discusses the Gulf War, warfare and bombings, the invasion of Kuwait, and more political and social turmoil.

== Plot ==
Nidali's story is narrated in first person. Coming from a mixed background and moving so frequently, Nidali is always aware of her difference. The story is set upon a backdrop of ethnic division, politics, war, culture, and the looming theme of "home". Although Nidali is battling war and strife, she is also subject to battle with her Palestinian father who has specific expectations and strict rules for his daughter throughout the novel.

Nidali is born in Boston to a Palestinian father (Baba) and Egyptian mother (Mama) and acquires an American passport. From the beginning, her life struggle is foreshadowed when she is given the name Nidali, the feminine version of "Nidal", which means "strife" or "struggle". Nidali begins growing up in Kuwait. However, her family is forced to flee to Egypt in 1990 when Saddam Hussein conducts the Iraqi Invasion. On her 13th birthday, bombs begin to go off, and Nidali's birthday goes unremembered. The family then travels by car to Egypt and settles into their summer home for safety.

In Egypt, Nidali is sent to live with her sick grandparent, giving her more freedom, being away from her father. This is where her relationship with her boyfriend Fakhr flourishes. The couple is most often depicted riding bikes and finding secret spots for their first sexual experience together. Throughout the book, Nidali navigates public affection and sexual experiences under the strict Arab law, as well as exploring masturbation. After spending time in Egypt, Nidali's father, Baba, declares he will find a job in the United States. After searching, he is chosen for a job in Texas as an architect. Baba flies to Texas first and establishes a mobile home. Soon after, Nidali, Mama, and her brother, Gamal, arrive in America.

Nidali is forced to transition from Eastern to Western culture quickly. In America, Nidali navigates life as an American learning customs, practices, holidays, and more. Here, Nidali attends a public high school, and takes interest in a boy named Omar Medina. She continues battling with her Baba as well. Nidali admits to her aspirations of becoming a writer and submits an application to a college in Boston. After much struggle and even running away from home, Nidali receives permission from her Mama and Baba to attend college in Boston.

== Characters ==
- Nidali: Female protagonist, main character, and narrator
- Baba: Nidali's strict, Palestinian father
- Mama: Nidali's Egyptian mother
- Gamal: Nidali's younger brother
- Geddo: Grandfather of Nidali; Mama's father
- Sido and Sitto: Nidali's Grandmother and Grandfather on Baba's side
- Fakhr el-Din: One of Nidali's love interests in Kuwait and Egypt
- Sonya: Nidali's aunt and Mama's sister
- Omar Medina: Nidali's love interest in Texas
- Tamer: Friend of Nidali
- Linda: Friend of Nidali
- Jiji: Friend of Nidali

== Awards ==
- Hopwood Award
- Arab-American Book Award

== Author: Randa Jarrar ==
Randa Jarrar was born in America. She grew up in Kuwait and Egypt, and after the Gulf War, moved to Texas with her family. Jarrar is now an author, novelist, essayist, translator, and writer of short stories. She also teaches at Fresno State as an assistant professor in the Master or Fine Arts Program in Creative Writing. The author's next series will be entitled Him, Me, Muhammad Ali (2016).
