= Narón =

- Municipality
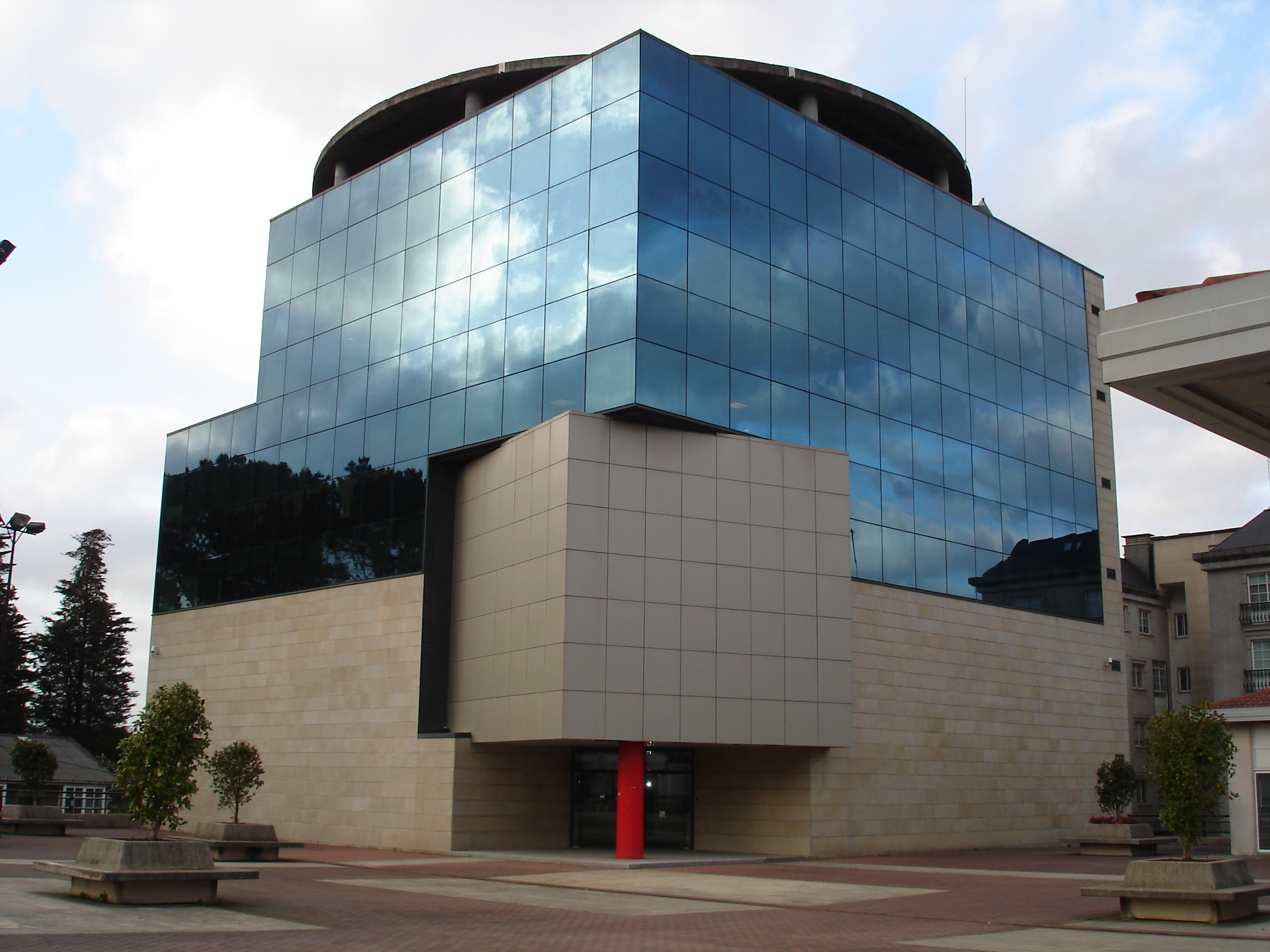
- Town Hall

- Flag Coat of arms
- Nickname: Terra de Trasancos
- Location of Narón
- Coordinates: 43°33′N 8°9′W
- Country: Spain
- Autonomous community: Galicia
- Province: A Coruña
- Comarca: Ferrolterra

Government
  - Mayor: Xosé Manuel Blanco

Area
  - Total: 66.91 km^{2} (25.83 sq mi)

Population (2025-01-01)
  - Total: 39,953
  - Density: 597.1/km^{2} (1,547/sq mi)
- Time zone: UTC+1 (CET)
  - Summer (DST): UTC+2 (CEST)
- Website: Official website

Narón (Spanish: [naˈɾon]) is a municipality in northwestern Spain in the autonomous community of Galicia. It belongs to the comarca of Ferrol.

Geographically, the town is very close to the Atlantic Ocean. The city of Ferrol is 5 km away. The nearest airports are located in the cities of A Coruña and Santiago de Compostela.

Narón has a train and bus connection to Ferrol as they form an urban continuum.

== Climate ==
Due to its proximity to the Atlantic Ocean, the Oceanic climate is predominant, with many rainy days, not having extreme oscillation in its weather conditions neither in winter nor in summer.

== Entertainment ==
Narón has two cultural centres, one big theatre with more than 1000 seats and another smaller auditorium. Also there is a 12 screen cinema within the Centro Commercial Odeón, one of the two big shopping centres of the comarca (a new shopping centre opened in Ferrol in October 2013). The town also has 2 nightlife areas: Carretera de Castilla and A Gándara, near the shopping mall, with both places full of pubs, music and traditional bars, restaurants and inns.

=== Festivities ===
In the month of May, May Day is celebrated on the 1st along with the Galician Literature Day, on the 17th. An Oenach is celebrated in August, remembering Celtic origins. The Día de Narón is celebrated every year on 23 November. Narón celebrates the National Day of Galicia on 25 July with concerts and several parties at the main square in the town, the Galician Square.

In addition to all the local fiestas, Narón also observes the national Spanish fiestas.

== Parishes (Parroquias) ==
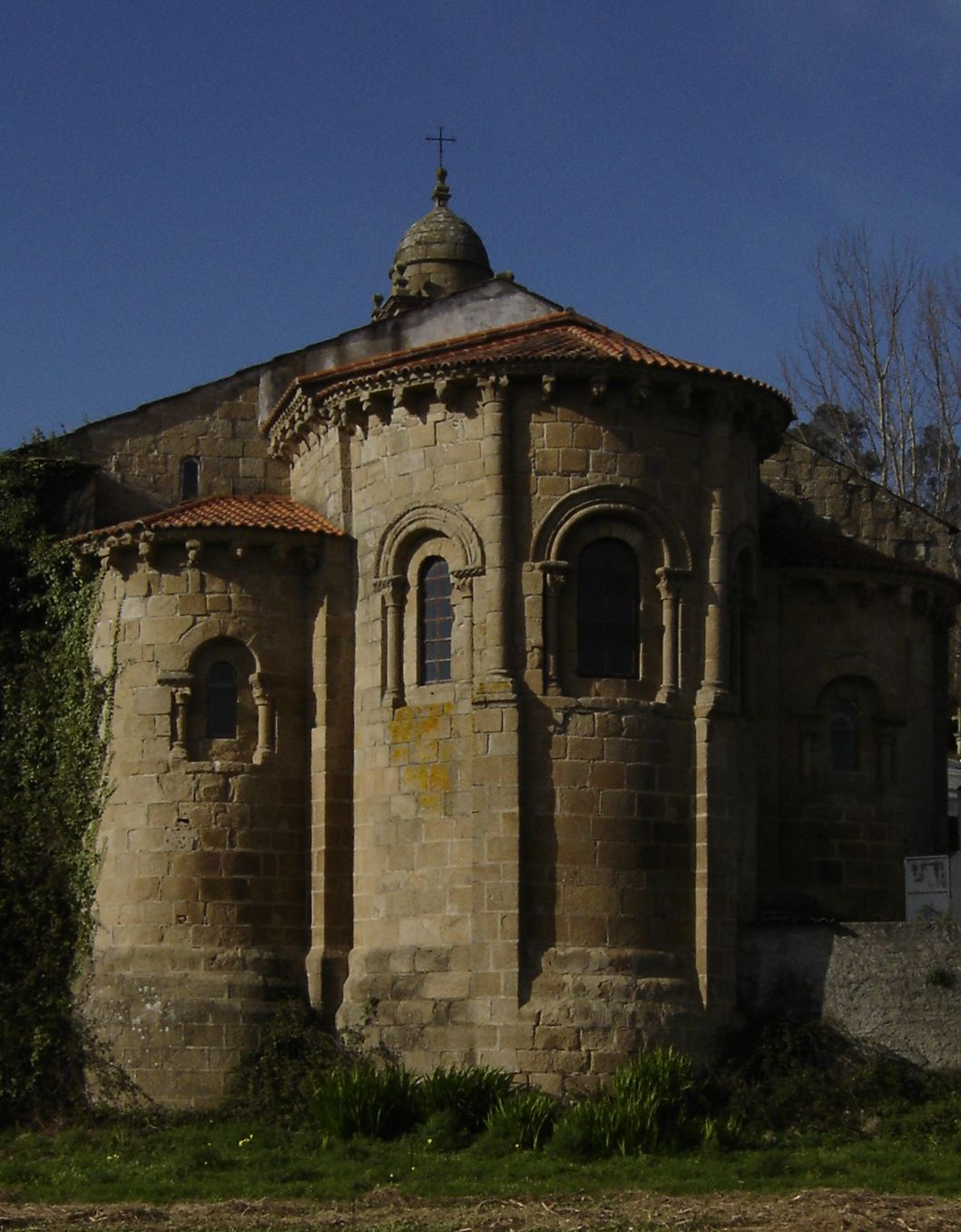
San Martiño de Xuvia, viewed from the south

The municipality includes 13 parishes:

- Castro
- Doso
- San Xiao de Narón (San Xiao)
- Pedroso
- Sedes
- San Mateo de Trasancos
- O Val
- Nosa Señora dos Desamparados - Piñeiros (Narón urban area)
- San Martiño de Xuvia - O Couto (Narón urban area) - includes The Monastery of Xuvia, also known as San Martiño de Xuvia or San Martín de Jubia, built at the beginning of the 12th century, in Romanesque style.
- San Xosé Obreiro - Outo do Castiñeiro (Narón urban area)
- Santa Icía - A Solaina (Narón urban area)
- Santa Rita de Xuvia (Narón urban area)
- Santiago Apóstolo - A Gándara (Narón urban area)

However, six of them (Pinheiros, O Couto, A Gándara, Outo do Castiñeiro, Xuvia and A Solaina) belong to the city center and now they are known as neighborhoods.

There are a total of 195 localities, the most prominent being A Gándara, A Solaina and Piñeiros, each of which has a population higher than 6,000. Narón town hall is located at Outo do Castiñeiro (also known, in Spanish, as Alto del Castaño).

== Education ==
Narón is home to four public Infant Schools, two Public Secondary High-Schools, six public Primary Schools and fourteen private schools.

== Languages ==
Both Castilian and Gallego are spoken in this area although statistics on the use and comprehension of both is not known at present. Tourists and travellers arriving to this area will most probably notice that there isn't much information or official notices either in English or in Spanish; most information and leaflets provided will be in local Galician. School children are taught in the Galician language, although many speak Castilian as their first language.

== Economy ==
The most important economic sectors are the tertiary and the secondary (services and industries) sectors, which employ 49.9% and 31.2% of the working population, respectively. Narón is a suitable place to build small industries because of its good potential for industrial development. The industrial estate, Río do Pozo, is being built and will become one of the largest business parks in Galicia, Spain. A Gándara is the place where another important industrial estate is. MEGASA and POLIGAL, two of the most prominent enterprises of the Galician iron and steel subsectors, are present in Narón. There are also other enterprises in such diverse industries as dairy, thermal insulation, electricity, electronics, construction materials, foodstuffs and distilling.

The industrial development of the borough, began in a few centuries ago, and consisted in different factories devoted to the leather tanning, textile mills and the use of water mills. Later, tile factories were stabilised in the region, together with shipyards and sawmills. Nowadays, and more recently, other industries flourished like traditional woodwork, stone, leather and ceramics workshops which in some cases can still be found.

The primary sector is the least important, comprising 5.7% of the working population. It produces cereals, potatoes, vegetables and cattle, and constitutes a complementary economic activity.

Since 1900, Narón has experimented a continuous steady growth, which during the 1960s and the 1970s accelerate itself due to the flourishing of the naval industry of Ferrol and Fene and the economic expansion which Spain was experiencing during those years. Narón, absorbed during those years a substantial influx of migrant workers from the most rural areas of Ferrolterra, localities such as San Sadurniño, Cedeira and Ortigueira to mention a few, including from areas of the interior, like Terra Chá in the province of Lugo. Often people came from other parts of Spain too, like people who were posted in the military sector to Ferrol, for example. This immigration rejuvenated the population structure and reinforced the development of different sectors like the construction industry, due to the necessity of housing. Those challenges transformed the area into a rural borough to become a lightly industrialized one. The lack of urban planning in the first stages of development caused a high population density in some neighbourhoods, specially those near Ferrol and the industry, following the corridor of "Estrada de Castela" which is the main artery today. The lack of provision of many utilities in the new urban areas created a town with many challenges that were completely solved during the last years (such as the connections between different neighbourhoods, the High-Voltage lines were buried and new urban developments were built in empty areas, pointing out the large development made where the new Town Hall was built, near the "Estrada de Castela". Buildings in Narón are not generally very high; only between four or five floors but some new buildings are higher, such as "As Torres", near the Highway. After the oil crisis of 1973, that economic expansion was stopped by the decline of the Shipbuilding Sector in neighbouring Ferrol, having some restructuring plans during the 1980s and early 1990s, following the Spanish accession to European Union. With the beginning of the 21st Century, Narón watched a new economy revival following the arrival of the motorway, the creation of large parks of wind mills in the Galicia, the completion of some business parks as Río do Pozo with big companies as Pull and Bear and Lidl, the Outer-Port just before the entrance of “A Ría” plus many other developments like bring cruises into Ferrolterra.

== Socio-cultural and economic development ==
Because of the Megalithic remains of A Moura, San Mateo and O Val and the existence of hill-forts (castros), albeit in a pitiful condition, in Eiravedra, Pereiruga, Petouzal, Quintá, Revolta, San Mateo, Sequeiro, Vicás and Vilasuso, it has been established that this land has been inhabited since ancient times. In the Middle Ages, there were some small monasteries, but the most important were San Martiño de Xuvia and San Salvador de Pedroso, which were the centers of the economic, cultural and religious life of the Terra de Trasancos. An often-visited place is the Presa do Rei, located at the river Xubia. There are also two water mills from the 18th-century, with important historic-cultural value. But the most representative monument in Naron is the Romanesque Church of O Couto, which is in the ancient monastery of San Martiño de Xuvia and dates from the 12th century. The church has a basilical layout (three naves and semicircular apses). Inside, there is the Gothic grave of Rodrigo Esquío. The portico and the tower of the façade were added later, in the 18th century. It is a building of great architectural value and is notable because of the merging of different styles.

Nowadays, Narón is working towards cultural enrichment. It might also be noted that the whole area has undergone a period of worrisome economic uncertainty due to the crisis in the naval building sector, the conflicts with European legislation, and competition from Asia.

== See also ==
List of municipalities in A Coruña
