= Ares, Spain =

Ares
- Municipality
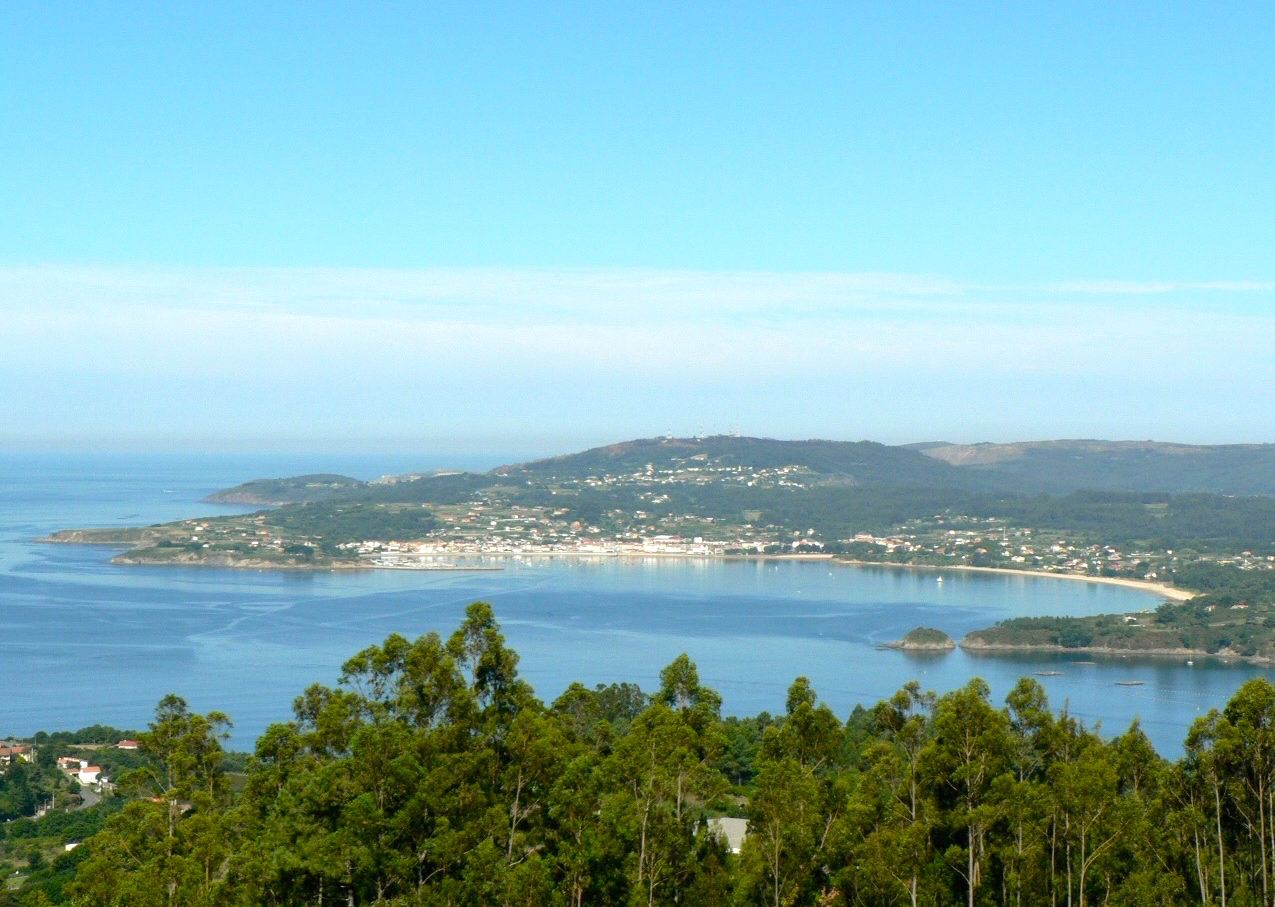
- View of the town

- Coat of arms

- Location in Spain.
- Coordinates: 43°25′40″N 8°14′30″W
- Country: Spain
- Autonomous community: Galicia
- Province: A Coruña
- Comarca: Ferrol / Ferrolterra

Government
  - Mayor: Julio Ignacio Iglesias Redondo (PSdG PSOE)

Area
  - Total: 18.51 km^{2} (7.15 sq mi)

Population (2024)
  - Total: 6,156
  - Density: 332.6/km^{2} (861.4/sq mi)
- Demonym: Aresanos
- Time zone: UTC+1 (CET)
  - Summer (DST): UTC+2 (CEST)
- Postal codes: 15623,15624,15625
- Website: Official website

Ares is a municipality in the autonomous community of Galicia in the province of A Coruña in northwestern Spain. It is located in the comarca of Ferrol. It spans the coastal strip running from the entrance of the estuary of the Ferrol river to the port of Redes.

== Economy ==
The economy is based on fishing, tourism and agriculture.

== See also ==
- List of municipalities in A Coruña
