= Pålsundet =

Coordinates: 59°19′11.74″N 18°1′57.9″E

Pålsundet is a strait (sund) in Stockholm, Sweden.
