= Randa Jarrar =

American writer and translator (born 1978)

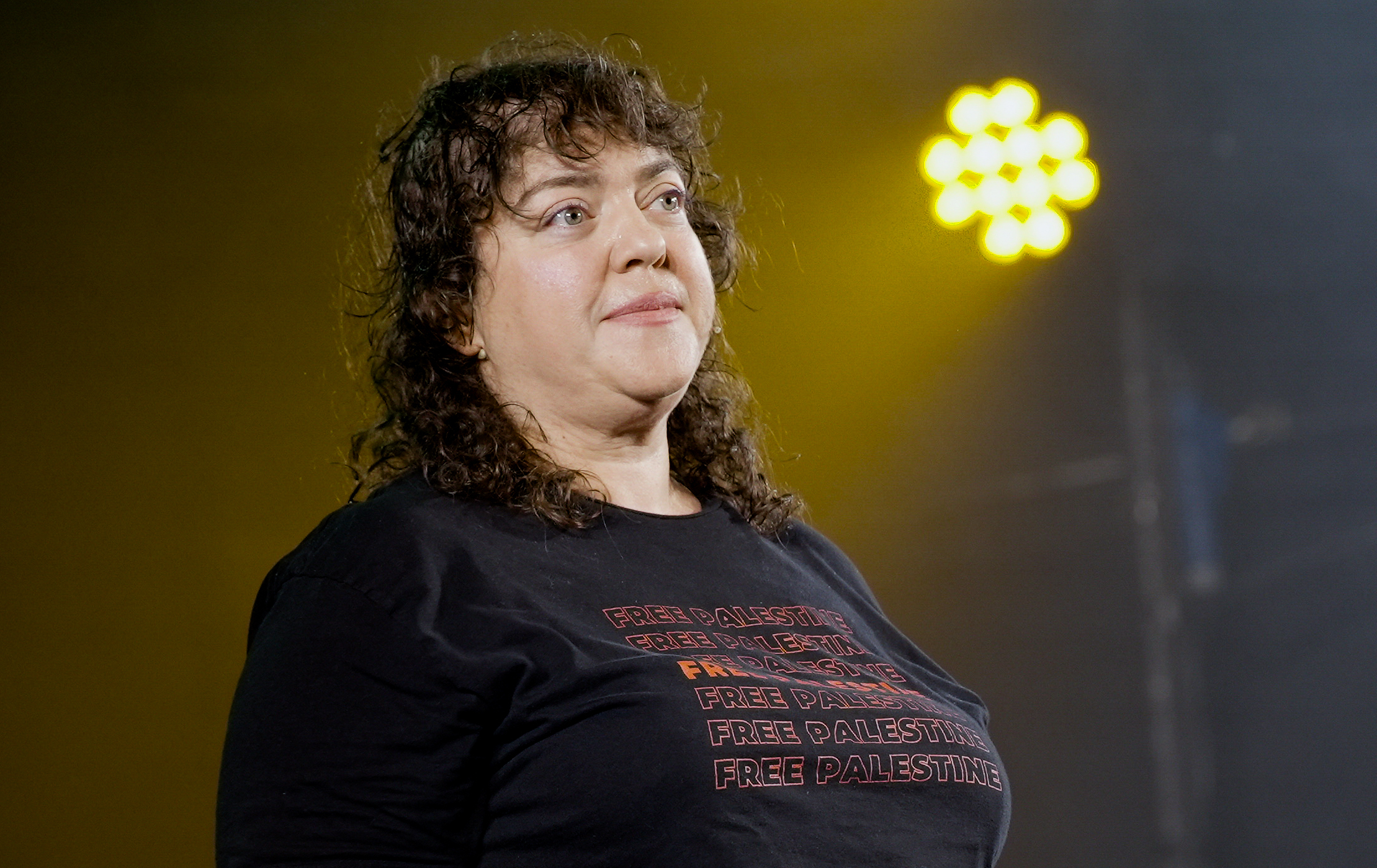
- Randa Jarrar at the 2025 Edinburgh Festival Fringe.
- Born: 1978 (age 47–48); Chicago, Illinois, U.S.
- Education: Sarah Lawrence College (BA); University of Texas at Austin (MA); University of Michigan (MFA)
- Writing career
- Language: English, Arabic
- Notable awards: Hopwood Award; Arab American Book Award

Randa Jarrar (born 1978), also known as Ra Jarrar, is an American writer and translator. Her (Note: Jarrar uses both he/him and she/her pronouns. This article uses she/her for consistency.) first novel, the coming-of-age story A Map of Home (2008), won her the Hopwood Award, and an Arab American Book Award. Since then she has published short stories, essays, the collection, Him, Me, Muhammad Ali (2016), and the memoir, Love Is an Ex-Country (2021).

She teaches creative writing in an MFA program at California State University at Fresno.

== Biography ==
Randa Jarrar was born in 1978 in Chicago, to an Egyptian mother and a Palestinian father. She grew up in Kuwait and Egypt. After the Gulf War in 1991, she and her family returned to the United States, living in the New York area. Jarrar studied creative writing at Sarah Lawrence College, receiving an MA in Middle Eastern Studies from the University of Texas at Austin, and an MFA in creative writing from the University of Michigan.

Jarrar became a creative writing professor at California State University.

Jarrar has written about her experiences with domestic violence and reproductive coercion. She is openly queer and uses he/him and she/her pronouns.

== Writings ==
Jarrar has written nonfiction and fiction, publishing her first short story in the prestigious Ploughshares literary journal in Fall 2004. Her short story, "You Are a 14-Year-Old Arab Chick Who First Moved to Texas" was the winner of the first Million Writers Award for online fiction. She has published two Lives columns in The New York Times Magazine, exploring her past as a single parent.

Her first novel came out in 2008. The Christian Science Monitor wrote: “Randa Jarrar takes all the sappy, beloved clichés about 'where you hang your hat' and blows them to smithereens in her energizing, caustically comic debut novel, A Map of Home.” Her second book, a 2016 collection of stories, won a PEN Oakland Award, a Story Prize Spotlight Award, and an American Book Award.

Jarrar was criticized for commentary on the death of former U.S. first lady Barbara Bush. She described the former first lady as "a generous and smart and amazing racist who, along with her husband, raised a war criminal. Fuck outta here with your nice words", referring to Bush's son, former president George W. Bush. In a further statement, she elaborated on her criticism of the Bush family, including the 2003 invasion of Iraq and the hearings of Anita Hill. Fresno State released a statement condemning her comments as critics called for her termination. During the controversy, Jarrar provided a telephone number on her Twitter account as if it was her own contact number, stating "If you really wanna reach me, here's my number ok?" The phone number that she provided was that of an emergency suicide/crisis hotline at Arizona State University. ASU said that they did not believe anyone who needed to get through was unable to.

Jarrar wrote an opinion piece called "Why I Can't Stand White Belly-Dancers", published in Salon in 2014. In this piece, she accused white women who belly dance to be committing cultural appropriation and brownface. Her commentary was widely criticized. In response to these criticisms, Jarrar wrote a follow-up to her piece, titled "I Still Can't Stand White Bellydancers". Novelist and comics writer G. Willow Wilson wrote in defense of Jarrar, saying that white women who belly dance "are exercising considerable privilege."

Jarrar called for the literary community to "DEMAND that white editors resign" saying that the community did not "have to wait for them to fuck up" in 2018. This was in response to a poem published in The Nation that made what commentators perceived as racist attempts at black vernacular.

In 2021, Jarrar published a memoir, Love Is an Ex-Country.

== Awards ==
- 2004 Million Writers Award for best short story online
- 2007 Hopwood Award for Best Novel
- 2009 Arab American Book Award
- 2016 Story Prize Spotlight Award
- 2017 American Book Award
- 2017 PEN Oakland Josephine Miles Award
- 2020 Creative Capital Award

== Bibliography ==
- —— (2008). A Map of Home: A Novel (hardcover 1st ed.). Other Press. ISBN 9781590512722.
- —— (2016). Him, Me, Muhammad Ali. Sarabande Books. ISBN 9781941411315.
- —— (2021). Love Is an Ex-Country. Catapult. ISBN 9781948226585.

=== Anthologies ===
- Words Without Borders: The World Through the Eyes of Writers, Alane Salierno Mason, Dedi Felman, Samantha Schnee (eds), Anchor Books, March 2007, ISBN 9781400079759
- Beirut39 Bloomsbury 2010
- Watchlist: 32 Short stories by persons of interest O/R Books 2016 ISBN 9781936787418

=== Translations ===
- The Year of the Revolutionary New Bread-making Machine by Hassan Daoud, 2007. ISBN 9781846590269, Published by Telegram, Paperback
- Jo Glanville, ed. (2006). Qissat: short stories by Palestinian women. Telegram. ISBN 9781846590122.
