= San Sadurniño =

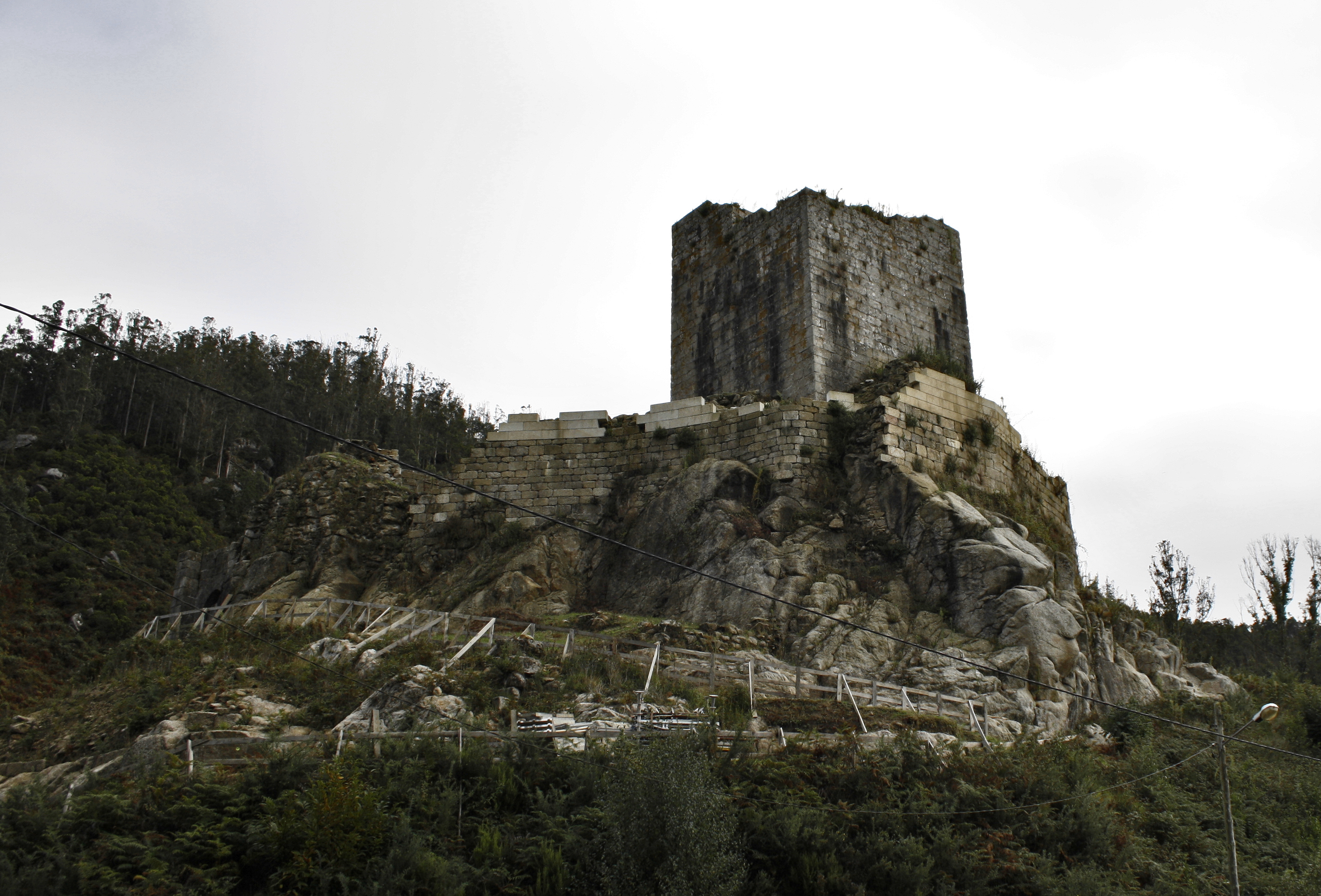
- Naraío Castle.

- Coat of arms

- Location in Spain.
- Coordinates: 43°34′N 8°2′W
- Country: Spain
- Autonomous community: Galicia
- Province: A Coruña
- Comarca: Ferrol

Government
  - Mayor: Secundino García Casal (BNG)

Area
  - Total: 99.68 km^{2} (38.49 sq mi)

Population (2025-01-01)
  - Total: 2,738
  - Density: 27.47/km^{2} (71.14/sq mi)
- Time zone: UTC+1 (CET)
  - Summer (DST): UTC+2 (CEST)

San Sadurniño is a municipality in the province of A Coruña in the autonomous community of Galicia in northwestern Spain. It belongs to the comarca of Ferrol. It is located in the valley of the Rio Grande de Xuvia. Sights include the ruins of the Naraío Castle and the Palaces of the marquises of San Sadurniño.

== See also ==
List of municipalities in A Coruña
