= Fene =

- Municipality
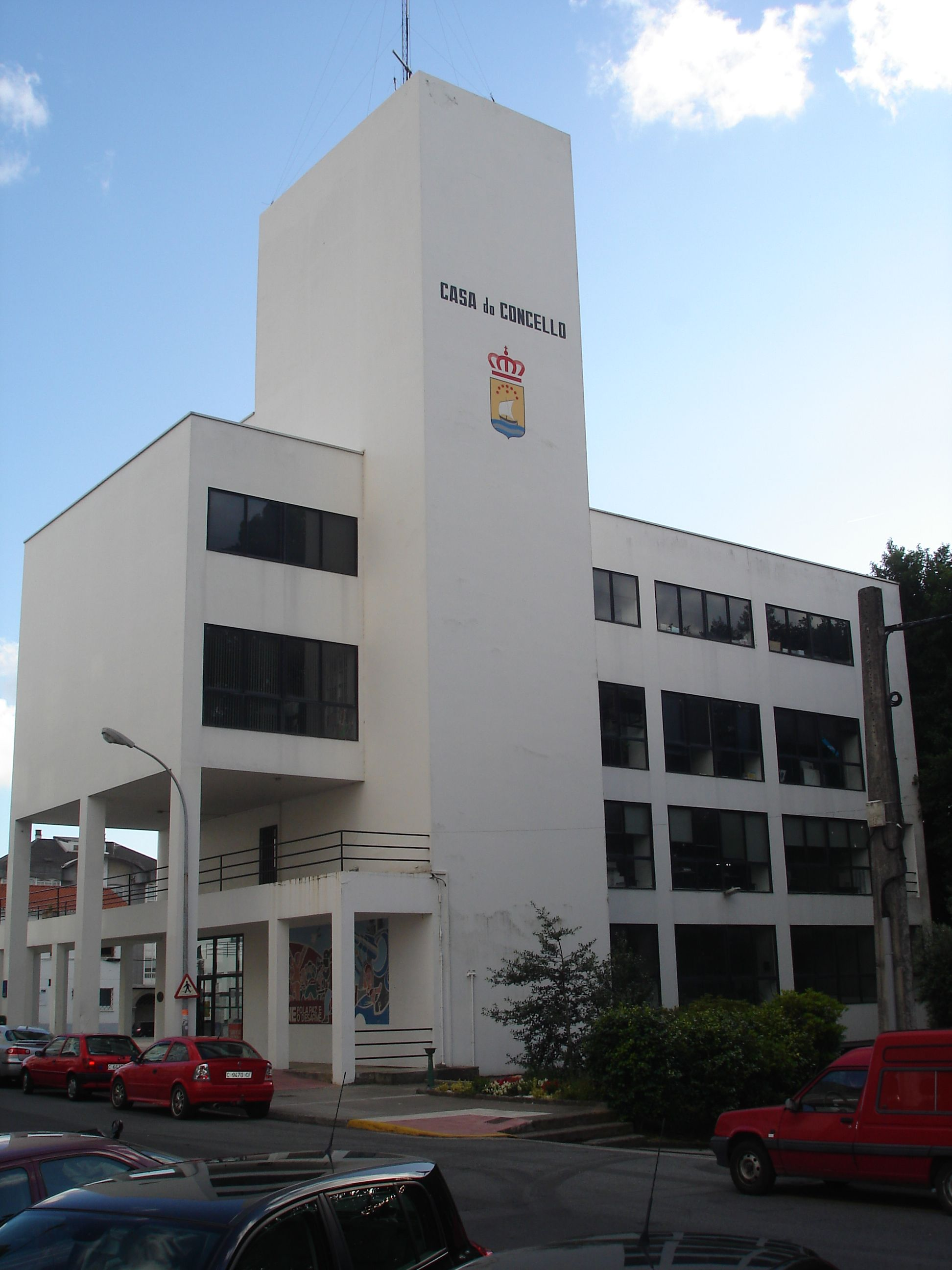

- Coat of arms

- Location in Spain.
- Coordinates: 43°28′N 8°10′W
- Country: Spain
- Autonomous community: Galicia
- Province: A Coruña
- Comarca: Ferrol

Government
  - Mayor: Juventino Trigo Rey (BNG, Galician Nationalist Bloc)

Area
  - Total: 26.29 km^{2} (10.15 sq mi)

Population (2025-01-01)
  - Total: 12,467
  - Density: 474.2/km^{2} (1,228/sq mi)
- Time zone: UTC+1 (CET)
  - Summer (DST): UTC+2 (CEST)
- Website: Official website

Fene (Galician pronunciation: [ˈfenɪ]) is a municipality in the province of A Coruña in the autonomous community of Galicia in northwestern Spain. It is located to the northeast of Galicia on the Ria of Ferrol.

== Economy ==
The Navantia Shipyards and services in the parts which are nearer Ferrol, the rest of the borough devotes itself to farming, agriculture and fishing.

In the late 1960s the gantry crane of the shipyards of Astilleros y Talleres del Noroeste (ASTANO) in Ferrolterra was the largest in Europe.

== See also ==
List of municipalities in A Coruña
