= Costa do Marisco =

The Costa do Marisco (Galician: [ˈkɔstɐ ðʊ maˈɾiskʊ]; "Shellfish Coast") is a Galician translation of the original Spanish 1950s term given as a label to the entire coast of Galicia in Spain. The term can be translated into English as the "Shellfish Coast". The area is known for its beaches.

== International surf competitions ==
- The Ferrolterra Pantin Classic annually attracts international figures in the world of surf.
- Doninos, Esmelle and St. George's Beach to the north of the province of A Coruña is marked by the quality of its beaches; most of them are ideal for water sports, such as surfing.

== Major commercial and fishing ports ==
=== Costa da Morte ===
- Camariñas - Fishing port - Costa da Morte
- Fisterra - Fishing Port - Costa da Morte
- Malpica de Bergantiños - Fishing port - Costa da Morte

=== Rías Altas ===
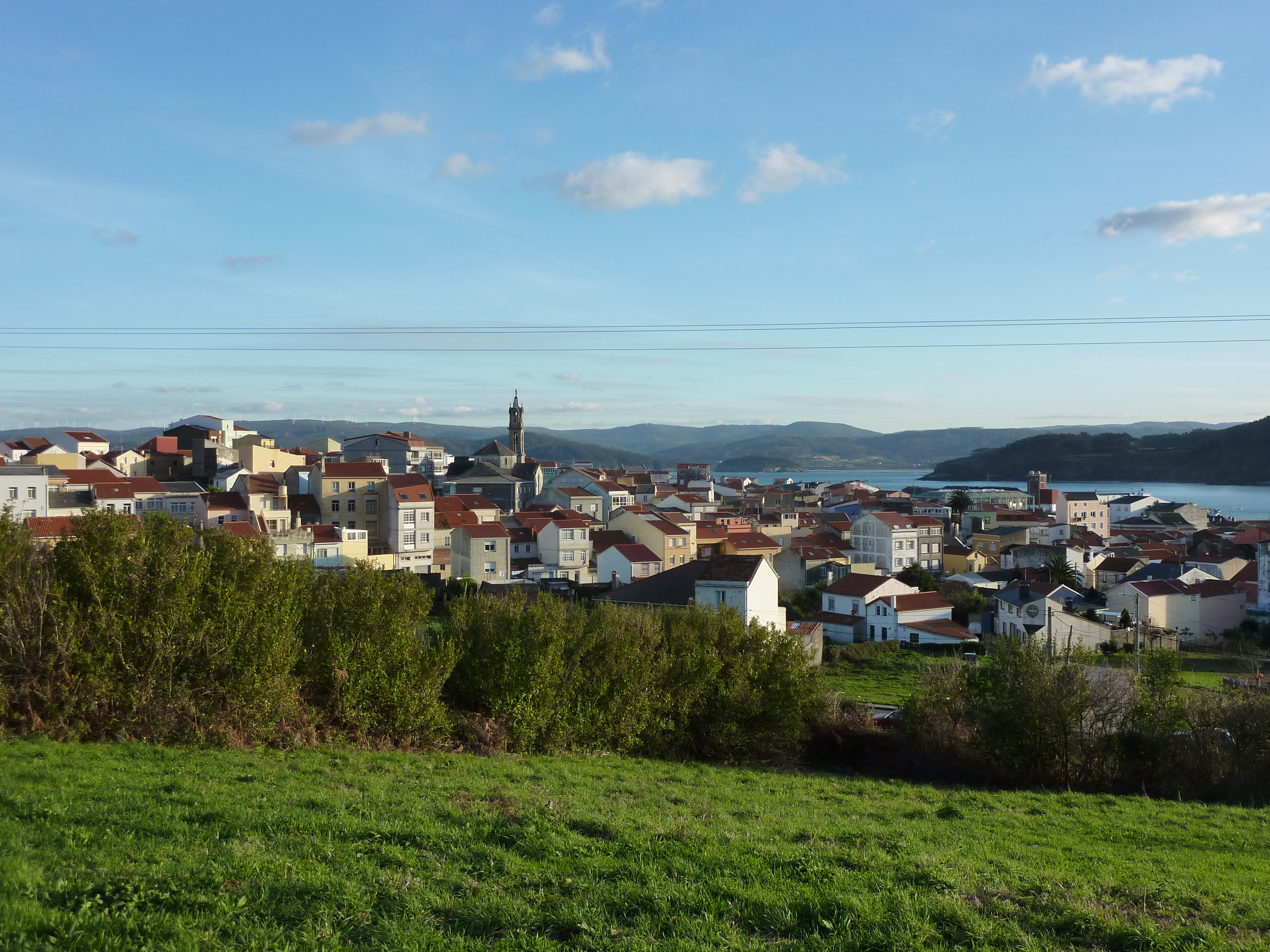
Cariño

- Burela - Fishing port - Rías Altas
- Cariño - Fishing port - Rías Altas
- Cedeira - Fishing port - Rías Altas
- Espasante - Fishing port - Rías Altas
- Ferrol - Commercial and military port - Rías Altas
- Foz - Fishing port - Rías Altas
- Ribadeo - Fishing port - Rías Altas
- San Cibrao - Commercial fishing port - Rías Altas
- Viveiro - Fishing port - Rías Altas

=== Rías Baixas ===
- Baiona - Fishing port - Rías Baixas
- Bueu - Fishing port - Rías Baixas
- Cangas do Morrazo - Fishing port - Rías Baixas
- Marin - Commercial port - Rías Baixas
- Santa Uxía de Ribeira - Fishing port - Rías Baixas
- Vigo - Commercial fishing port - Rías Baixas
