= Cliffs of Vixía Herbeira =

Cliff in Galicia, Spain

- Sea cliffs
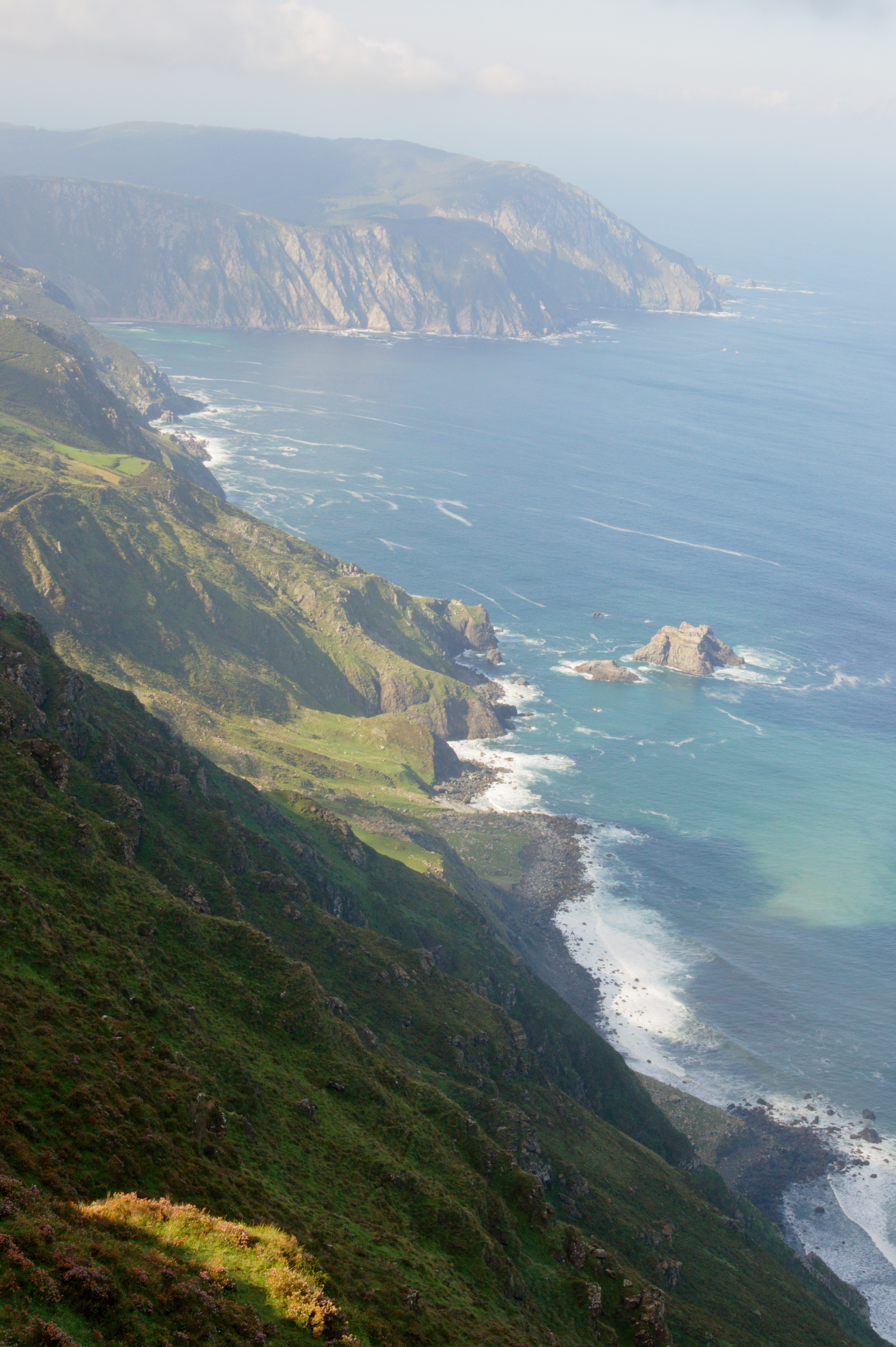
- Viewed from the Garita da Herbeira
- Interactive map of Cliffs of Vixía Herbeira
- Coordinates: 43°43′26.17″N 7°56′50.64″W
- Location: Cariño and Cedeira, Galicia, Spain
- Elevation: 621 m (2,037 ft)

The cliffs of Vixia Herbeira (Galician: Acantilados de Vixía Herbeira) are sea cliffs located at the north coast of Galicia, in Spain. At their highest point, they rise 621 metres above the Atlantic Ocean, being the highest cliffs in continental Europe, and the fourth tallest including islands.

== Location ==
They are located in the Capelada mountain range, between the municipalities of Cariño and Cedeira, in the province of A Coruña. The DP-2205 road that connects Cariño with Cedeira and the village and sanctuary of San Andrés de Teixido borders the cliffs at their highest point. Very close to them is Cape Ortegal, a place of great geological importance and one of the northernmost points in the Iberian peninsula. In this area there are small, now abandoned mines used for extraction of nickel in the 19th and early 20th centuries. In one of these quarries, zaratite was discovered in 1849, one of the few minerals discovered in Spain.

== Garita da Herbeira ==
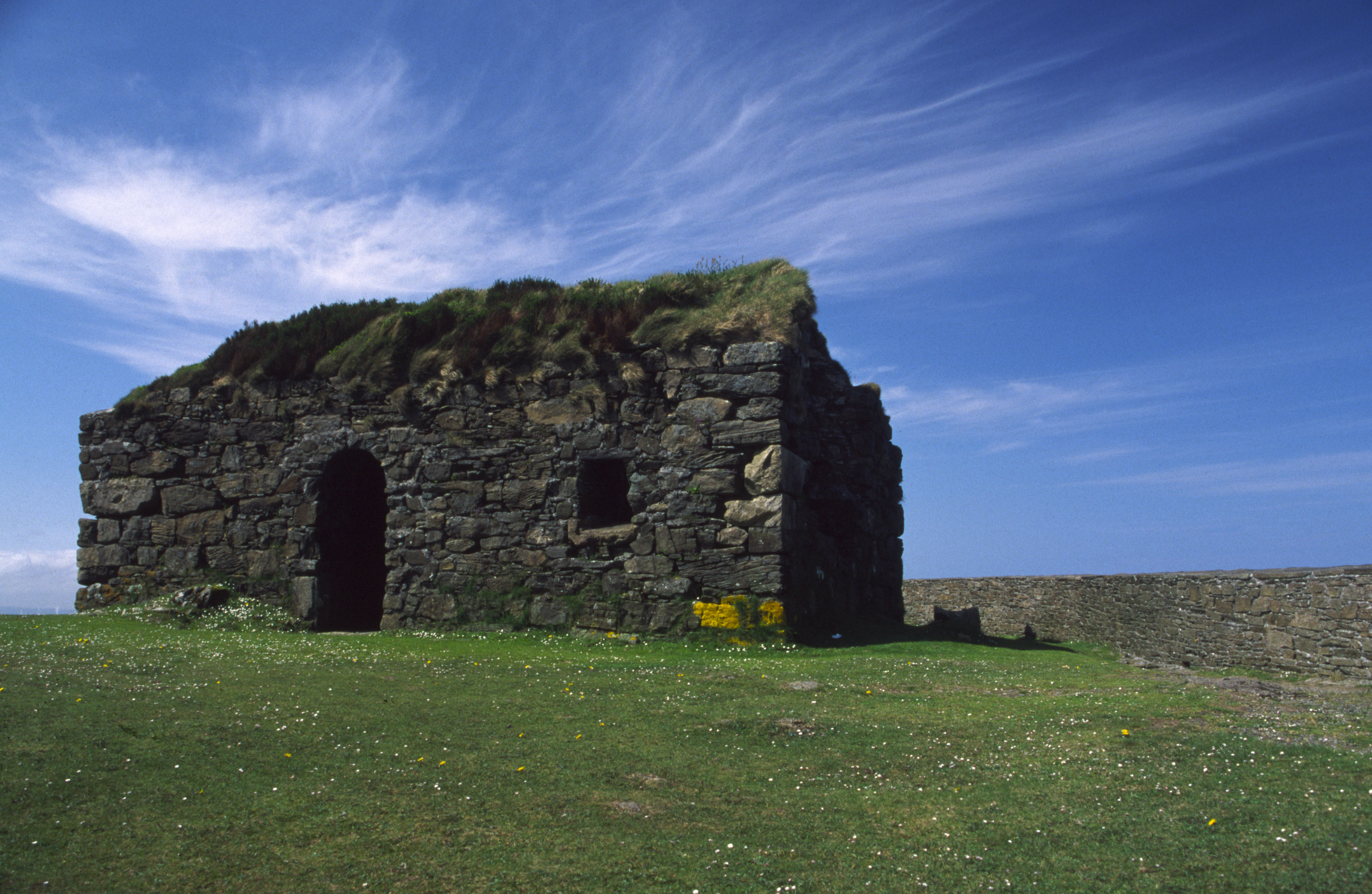
Garita da Herbeira

At the highest point and right on the edge of the cliff there's a small watchtower known as Garita da Herbeira. It's an old stone building with a vaulted ceiling of about 15 m², originally built in the 18th century. The current construction dates from 1805 and was part of a series of coastal and maritime surveillance posts along the coast.

In 2003, the watchtower and its surroundings underwent restoration and rehabilitation work.

== See also ==
- Rías Altas
