= A Costa da Morte =

A Costa da Morte may refer to:

- Costa da Morte, Spain
- A Costa da Morte (album)
