= Rías Altas =

Section of A Costa do Marisco in Spain

Official hydrographical sector of Rías Altas

Costa Ártabra is colloquially also part of Rías Altas

Rías Altas (also called "Upper Rias") is the northernmost of three sections of A Costa do Marisco (the Seafood Coast) in Galicia, Spain. It extends from the port of Ribadeo to Santa Cruz.

The Upper Rias refers to the coast of the northern part of A Coruña Province and the entire coastline of the Lugo Province.

The biggest city port of the Upper Rias is Ferrol - the most important Naval Station in North-western Spain.

== Major commercial and fishing ports ==
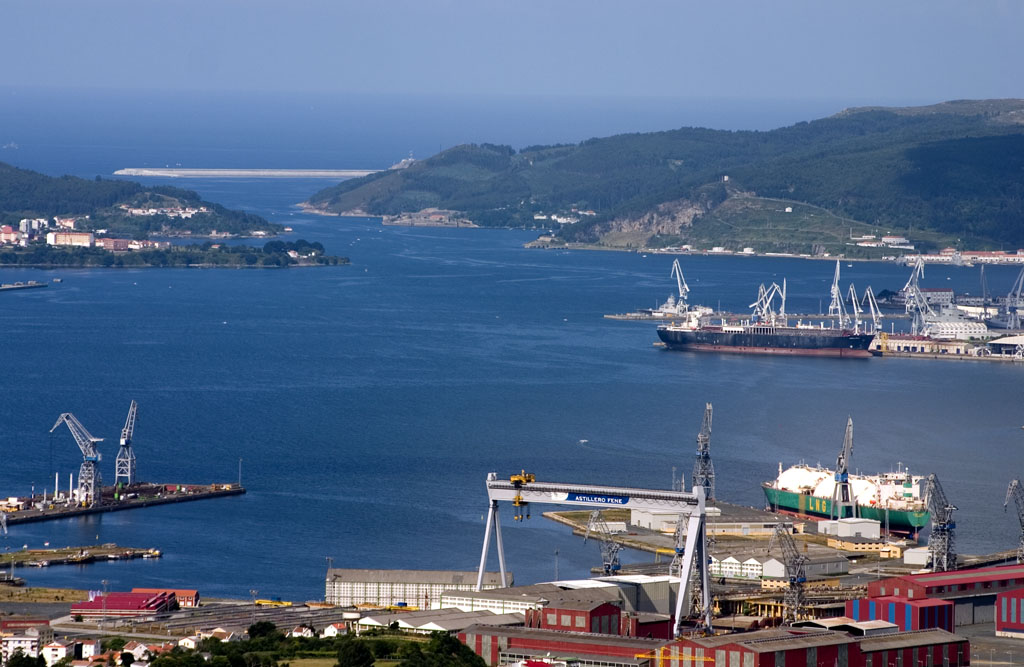
The biggest city port of the Upper Rias is Ferrol

- Ferrol - Major Commercial Ports (also: Military) - - A Coruña Province
- Cedeira - Fishing Port - - A Coruña Province
- Cariño - Fishing Port - - A Coruña Province
- Espasante - Fishing Port - - A Coruña Province
- O Barqueiro - Fishing Port - - A Coruña Province
- Viveiro - Fishing Port - - Lugo Province
- San Cibrao - Major Commercial Port (also: Fishing Port) - - Lugo Province
- Burela - Fishing Port - - Lugo Province
- Foz - Fishing Port - - Lugo Province
- Ribadeo - Fishing Port - - Lugo Province

== International World Surf Competitions ==
- The Ferrolterra Pantin Classic gathers every year some of the most international and remarkable figures in the world of surf
- Doninos, Esmelle and St. George's Beach the north of the A Coruña Province is known for the quality of its beaches as most of them are ideal for Water Sports like surfing.

== Locations along the Upper Rias ==
These are some of the towns, villages, hamlets and cities along the Upper Rias Coast (that is, the "Rías Altas") including the Naval Station and the largest city port of the Upper Rias: Ferrol.

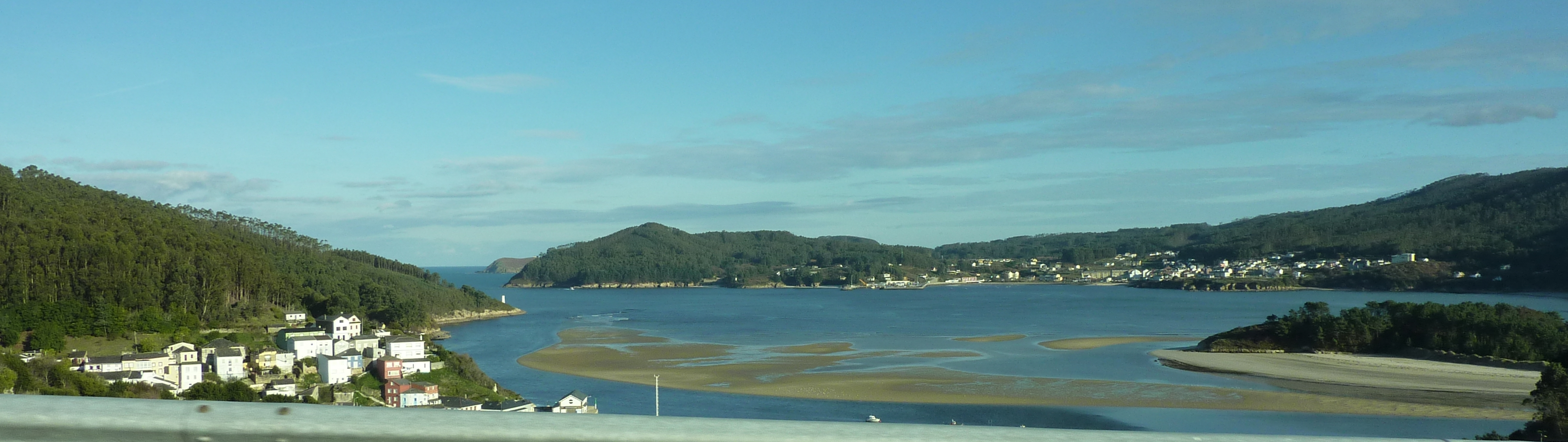
Ria of O Barqueiro (river Sor Mañón)

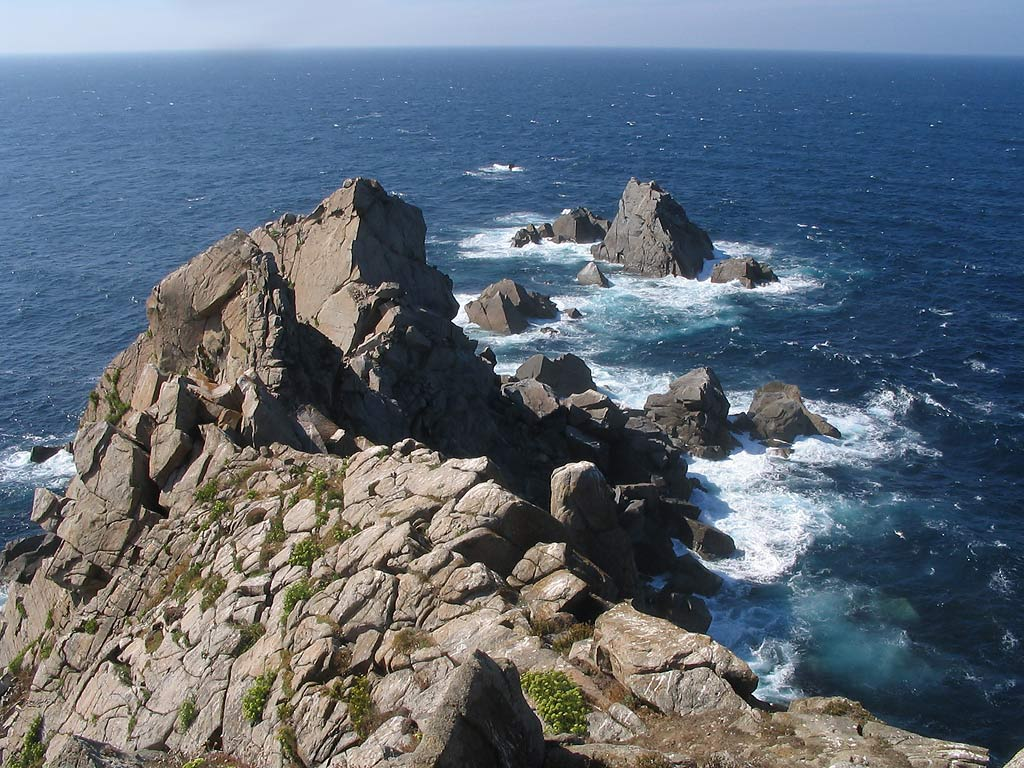
Estaca de Bares

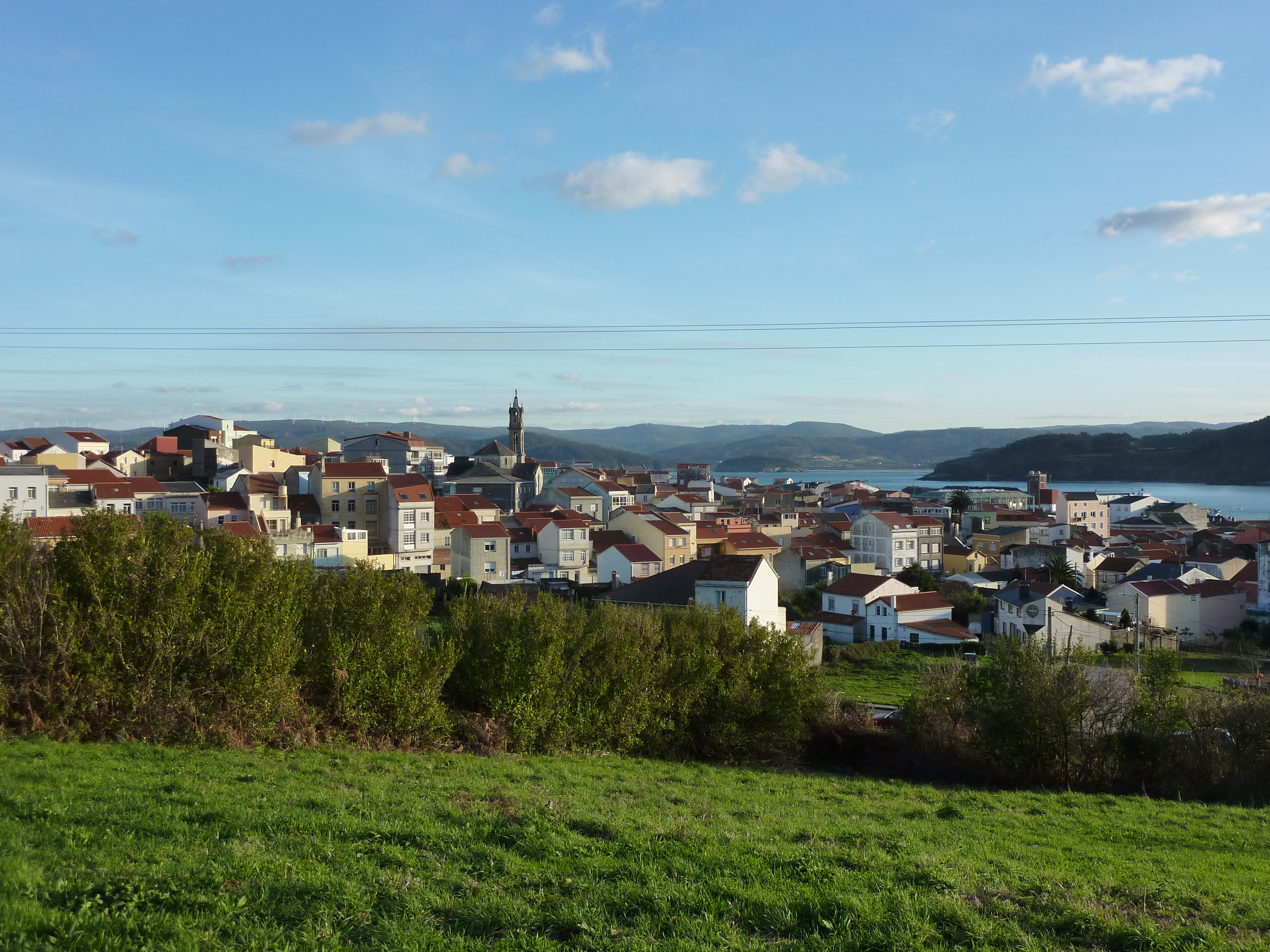
Cariño

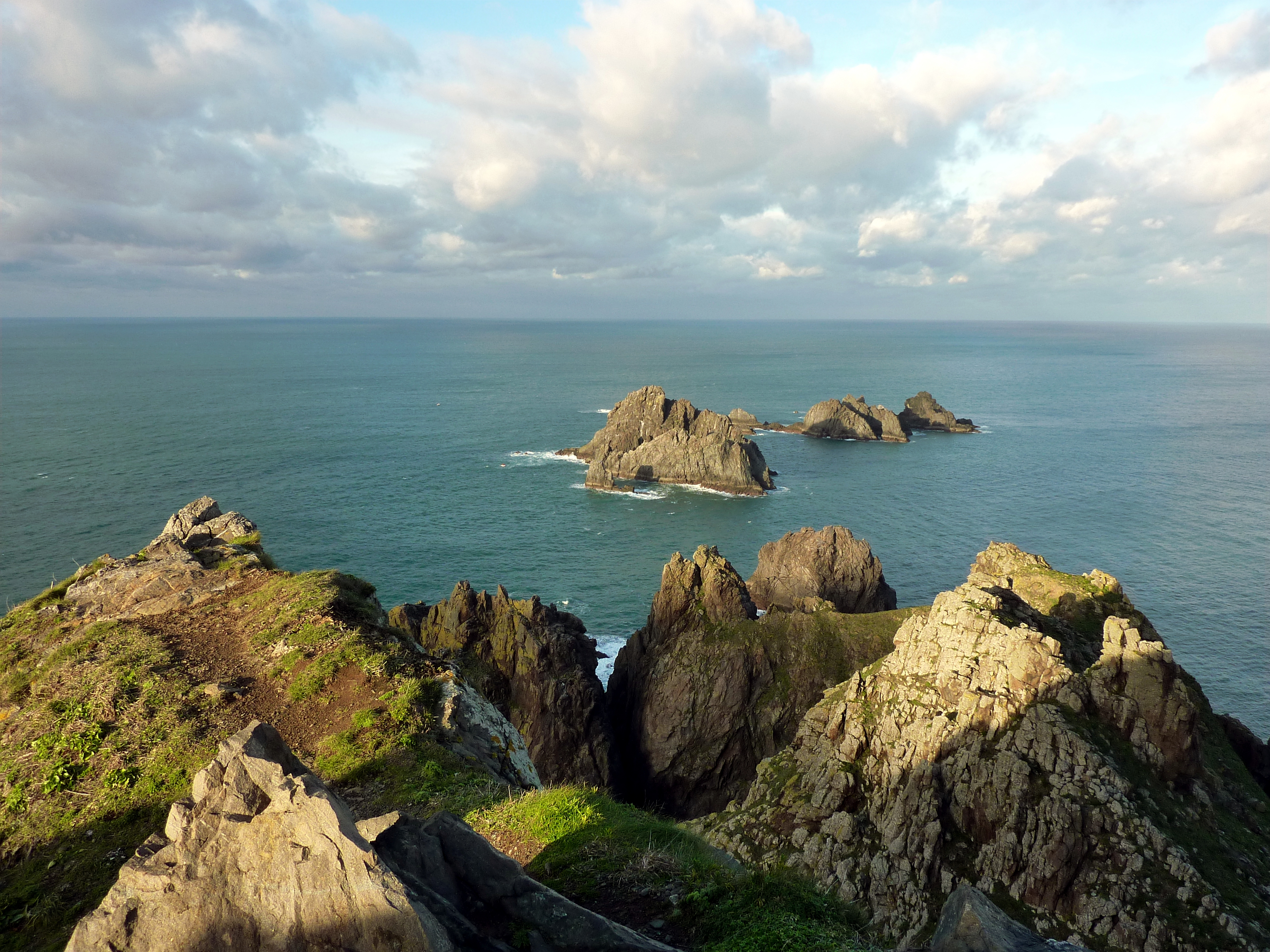
Cabo Ortegal

1. Ribadeo
2. Rinlo
3. Reinante
4. San Cosme de Barreiros
5. Foz
6. Fazouro
7. Cangas de Foz
8. Burela
9. Punta de Laxes
10. Coido
11. San Cibrao
12. Praia do Lago
13. Porto Celo
14. Viveiro
15. O Vicedo
16. O Barqueiro
17. Estaca de Bares
18. Punta Maeda
19. Espasante
20. Ortigueira
21. Cariño
22. Cabo Ortegal
23. Costa da Capelada
24. San Andrés de Teixido
25. Punta Candieira
26. Ria de Cedeira
27. Villarrube
28. Valdoviño
29. Montefaro
30. Casal
31. Ponzos
32. Cabo Prior
33. Doniños
34. Cabo Prioriño
35. Castelo de San Felipe
36. Ferrol
37. Mugardos
38. Ares
39. Cabanas
40. Pontedeume
41. Perbes
42. Miño
43. Sada
44. Gandario
45. Carnoedo
46. Lorbé
47. Illa a Marola
48. Mera
49. Santa Cruz

== See also ==
- The Death Coast (also "Costa da Morte") with its biggest city port in A Coruña.
- The Lower Rias (also "Rías Baixas") with its biggest city port in Vigo.
- A Costa do Marisco, Galicia (Spain)
