= Costa da Morte =

Part of the coast in Galicia, Spain

Coordinates: 43.1°N 9.1°W

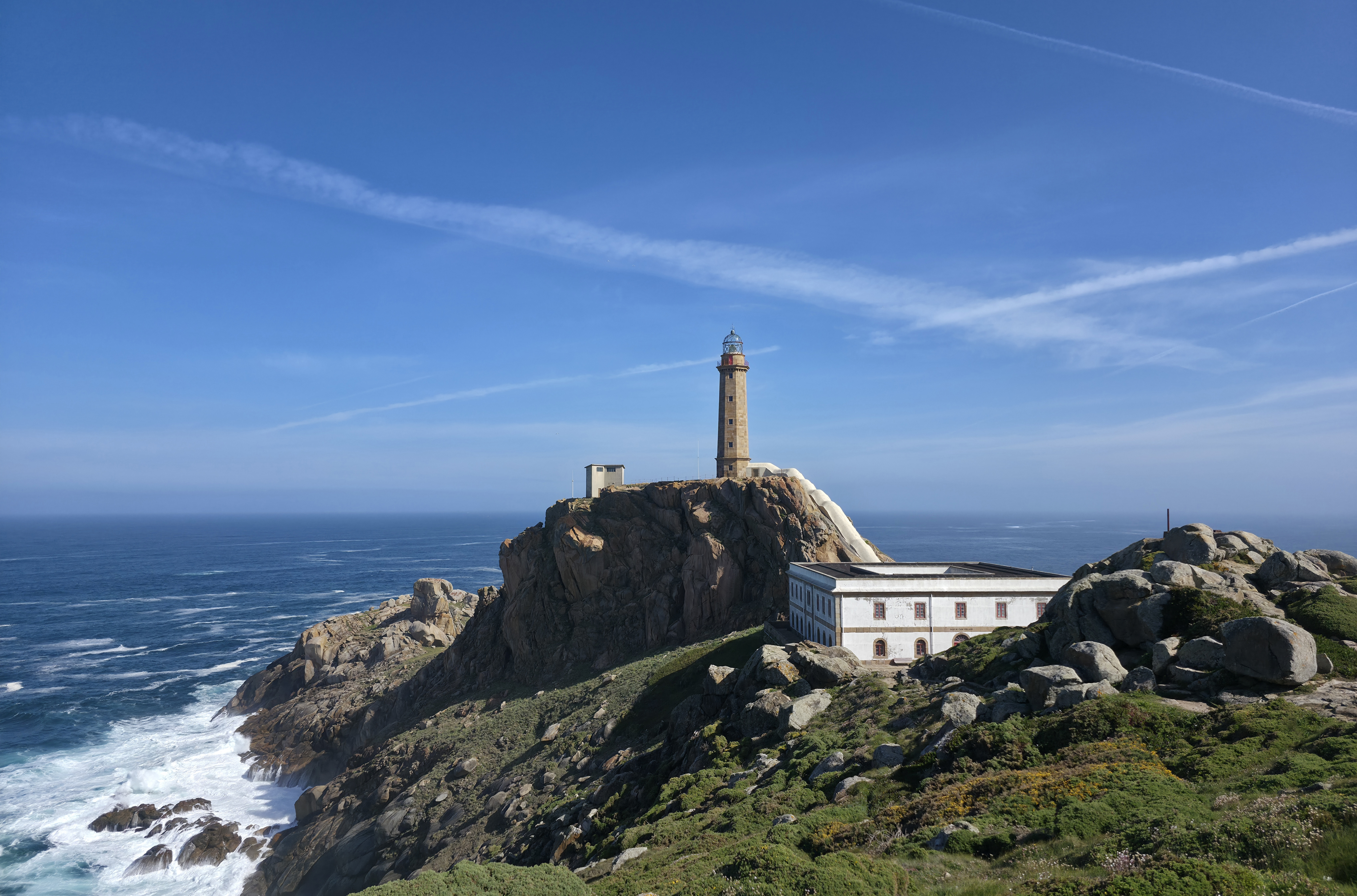
Cape Vilán

Costa da Morte (Galician: [ˈkɔstɐ ðɐ ˈmɔɾtɪ]; "Coast of Death") is a part of the Galician coast. The most common definition of the Costa da Morte encompasses Cape Finisterre to Malpica, though broader definitions might extend from Muros to A Coruña.

== Toponymy ==
The Costa da Morte received its name from the numerous shipwrecks along its treacherous rocky shore, exposed directly to the Atlantic Ocean. One of the most widely reported was that of the English torpedo cruiser HMS Serpent in 1890, which resulted in the deaths of 173 of its 176 crew members. The area also suffered one of the worst oil spills in history, caused by the sinking of the MV Prestige in 2002.

Although shipwrecks had occurred since ancient times, they became more frequent in the 19th century as Atlantic maritime trade, particularly from the United Kingdom, increased. The name first appeared in a 1904 article published in the Galician newspaper El Noroeste, which drew attention to a series of shipwrecks that had occurred along the coast in previous decades. Less than a month after the article was published, another shipwreck made headlines across the country, and references to the ‘Coast of Death’ soon became commonplace.

== Geography ==
The coast is situated at the north-western corner of the Iberian Peninsula, within the province of A Coruña. It comprises the historical regions (comarcas) of Bergantiños, Terra de Soneira, and Fisterra. However, broader definitions extend it to include parts of neighbouring comarcas, such as A Coruña, Ordes, Xallas, and Muros.

The westernmost part of the coast was known to the Romans as Finisterrae, meaning "Land's End". Like Finistère in Brittany, France, it was considered one of the boundaries of the known world. Contrary to popular belief, Cape Finisterre is not the westernmost point of continental Spain. That distinction belongs to Cape Touriñán, located north of Finisterre. Another headland that stands out for its geography and history is Cape Vilán, situated on one of the most dangerous stretches of the Costa da Morte. Its lighthouse was the first in Spain to use electricity, in 1896.

=== Rias ===
Although not as big as those of the Rías Altas or Rías Baixas, the Costa da Morte is characterised by its coastal inlets, known as rias.

- Corcubión ria
- Camariñas ria
- Corme e Laxe ria
- Lires ria

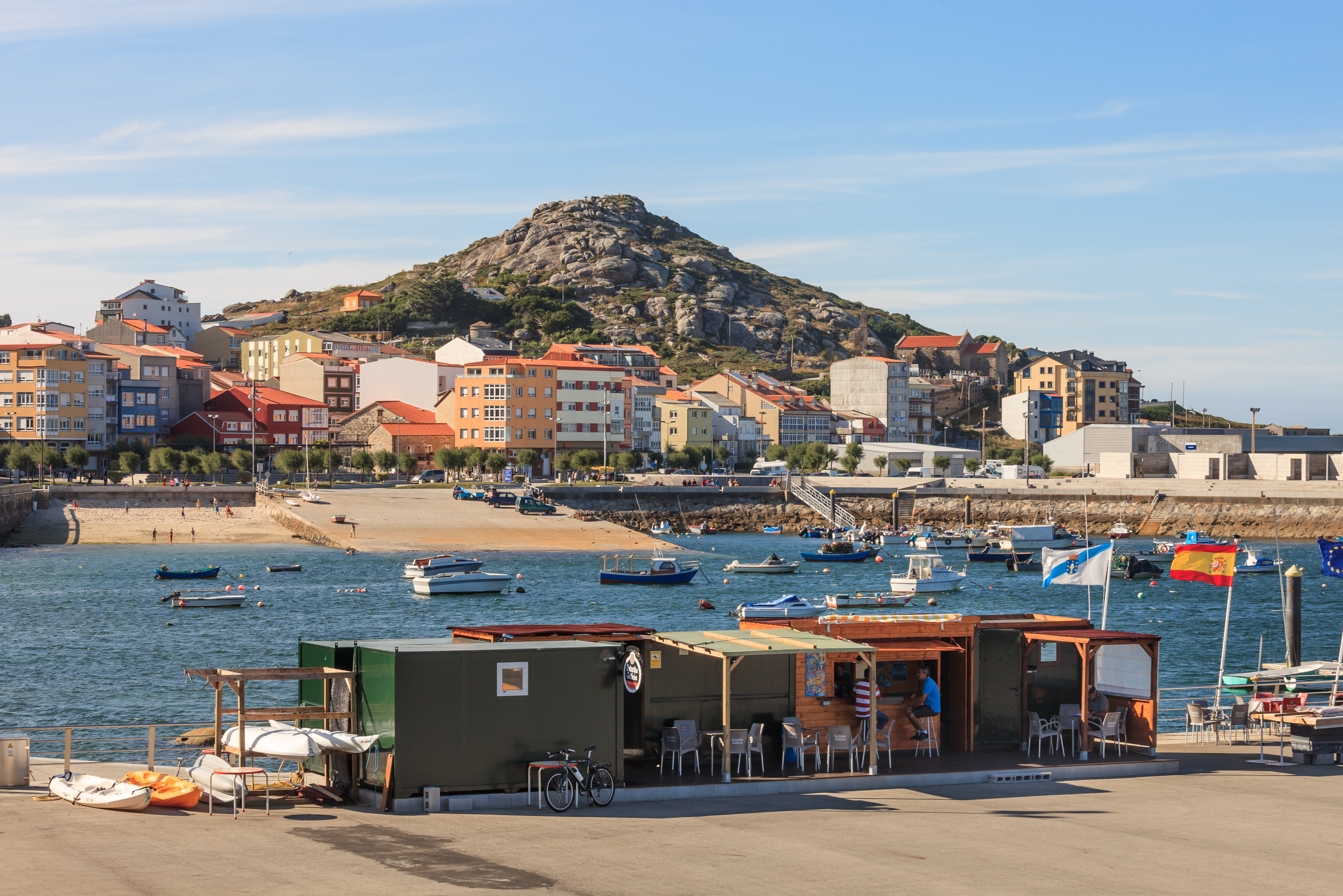
Town and port of Muxía

=== Major commercial and fishing ports ===
- Malpica
- Camariñas
- Muxía
- Fisterra
- Laxe
- Cee
- Ponteceso

== History ==
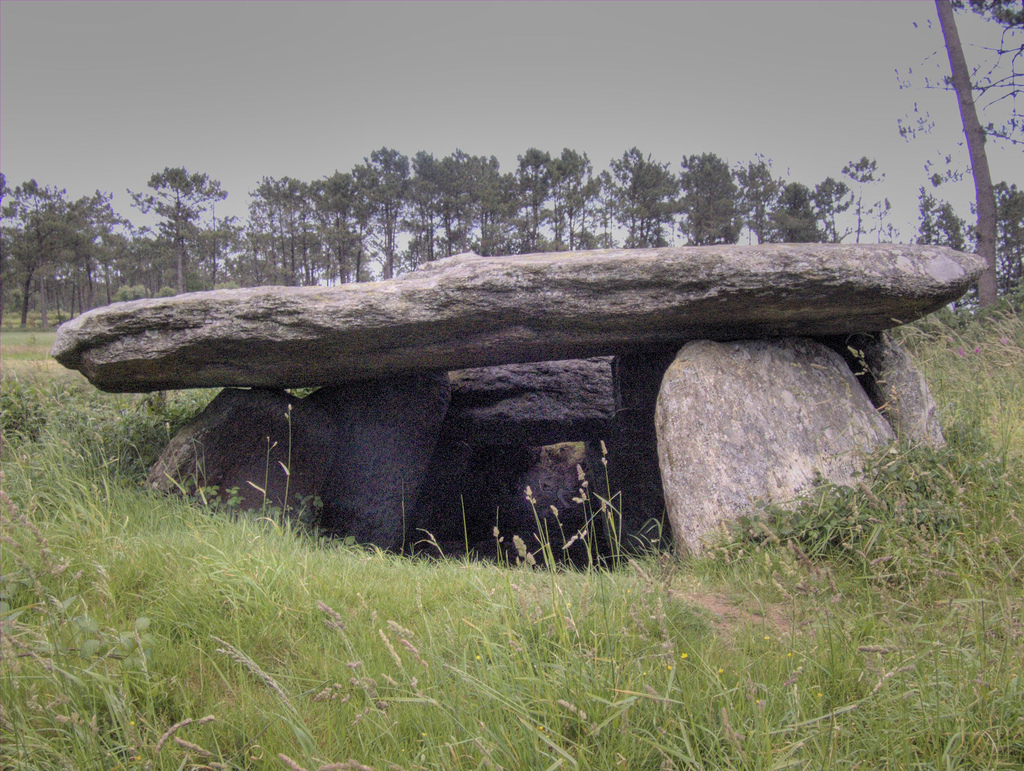
Pedra da Arca dolmen, in Dumbría

The region is home to one of the largest concentrations of megalithic funerary monuments in the north-western Iberian Peninsula. This culture developed between approximately the 4th and 3rd millennia BC, forming part of a broader phenomenon that spread across Western Europe. The most common and characteristic monuments are mámoas, burial mounds containing a dolmen.

The area was largely Christianized in the Middle Ages by the Catholic Church, with the aid of a large flux of pilgrims arriving on the Camino de Santiago (Way of St. James). However, the people of the area still preserve pre-Christian ritual places and pass on some of the traditional beliefs. For example, there are giant pedras de abalar (i.e. "oscillating stones", the common term in English is rocking stone) throughout the region. These pedras de abalar were sacred locations and used in various rituals that are remembered in local culture. There is also a local legend that the wind creates wild nightmares.

== See also ==
- Rías Altas
- Rías Baixas
- Costa do Marisco
- Way of the Lighthouses
