= Rías Baixas =

Series of estuarine inlets in Galicia, Spain

- Rías Baixas
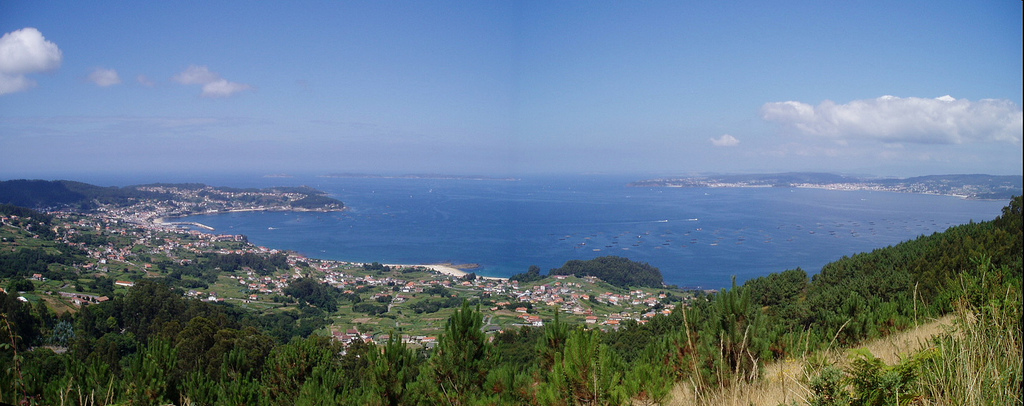
- A view over the Ria de Pontevedra, the central Ria

- Location of Pontevedra within the Rias within Spain
- Location: Galicia, Spain

The Rías Baixas (Galician for "Lower Rias") in spanish Rías Bajas, are a series of four estuarine inlets located on the southwestern coast of Galicia, Spain. They are the Ría de Muros e Noia, the Ría de Arousa, the Ría de Pontevedra, and the Ría de Vigo. The northernmost Rías Baixas begin below Cape Finisterre while the southernmost rias border the Portuguese coast, taking up the southern part of the Province of Coruña and the entire Province of Pontevedra. Its capital is the city of Pontevedra. Due to unique conditions, the Rías Baixas are rich in marine life which helps the fishing and aquaculture industry of the area. Beaches, marinas, distinctive towns, and plenty of water activities also attract tourists, providing another source of income.

== Geology ==
Though individually distinct, each of the Rías Baixas share some common characteristics. They begin along the coastline of the Atlantic Ocean and jut inland, eventually meeting up with a river. Each ria has a basic funnel shape as well, being wider at the ocean and narrowing as it approaches land and the river. Geologists believe that the Rías Baixas formed as a result of tectonic action which sunk certain land areas near the coast and along river valleys. These areas were subsequently flooded by water from the ocean and adjoining rivers. Over time, erosion also helped shape each inlet.

Water from the ocean flows into the ria and is eventually joined by inland rivers. This creates an estuary (a body of water where salt and fresh water mix). Geologists break each ria into two basic zones based on the composition of the water and sediments: the outer zone and the inner zone. The outer zone is that which joins with the Atlantic Ocean. The inner zone is inland where rivers join with the ria. Another way to refer to these two zones is with the terms "mouth" and "head". The mouth of the ria is the part closest to the ocean and the "head" joins with the river.

== Geographical area ==
The Rias within Galicia

The four rias that make up the Rías Baixas are distinct from the more northern Rías Altas ("Upper Rias") in location and other characteristics. As compared to the Rías Altas, the waters of the Rías Baixas are calmer and smoother. The coast that contains the Rías Altas is sometimes known as the Costa da Morte (in Galician: Coast of Death), due to a high number of shipwrecks, a fact that only underlines the turbulent nature of the waters. Most of the Rías Baixas have islands in the ocean near the mouth, which help to create the calm waters.

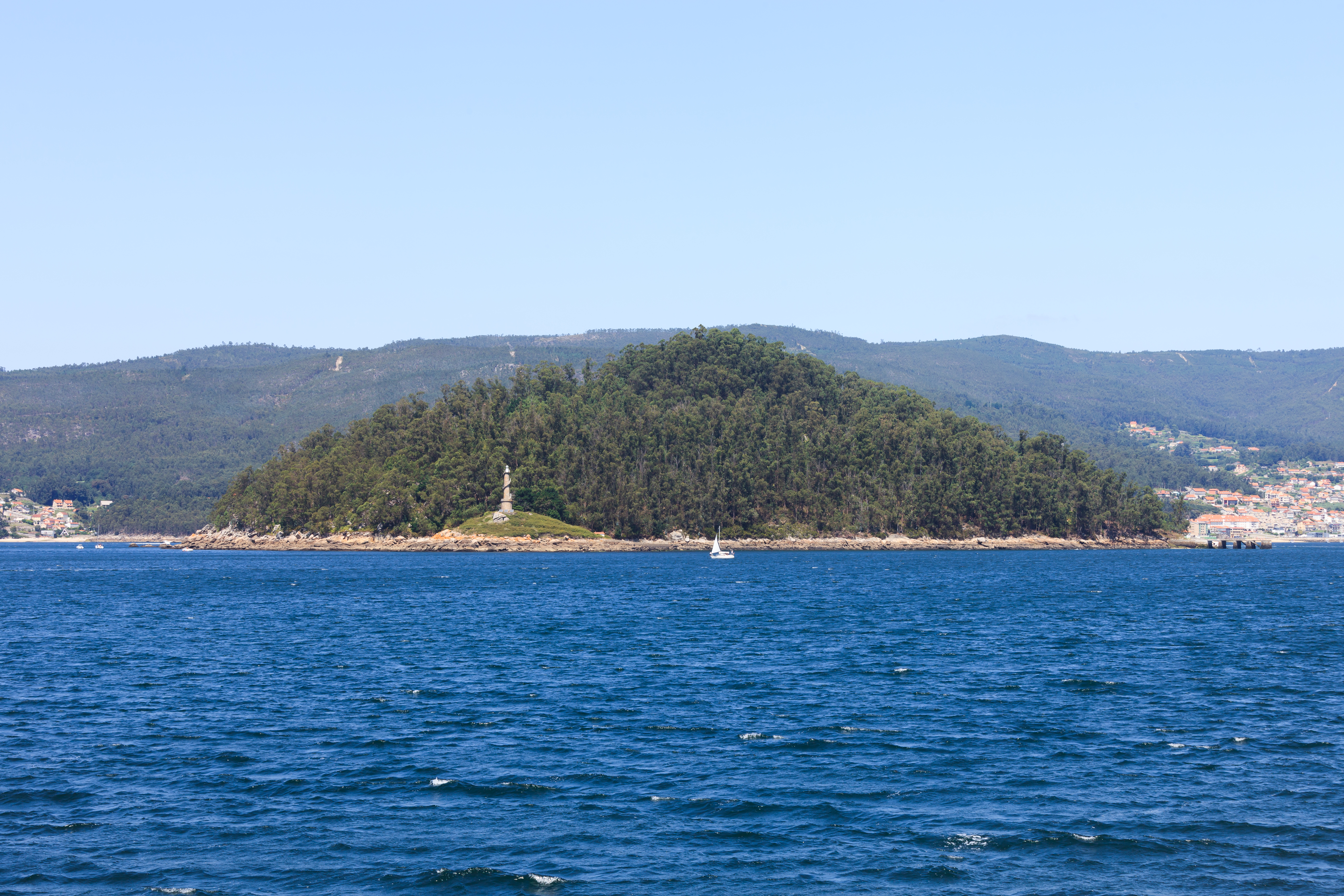
Tambo island in the Ría of Pontevedra

Due to the proximity to the ocean, the climate of the area is mild and moist. This creates the green landscape for which the area is known. The land around the Rías Baixas is also known for abundant pine and eucalyptus forests. Neither pine nor eucalyptus is indigenous to the area, but were introduced and have taken hold. Naturally occurring vegetation includes oak and chestnut trees.

Each of the Rías Baixas shares its name with a major inland city. In the case of the Muros e Noia, it is two separate cities. The Ría de Arousa gets its name from the longer Vilagarcía de Arousa.

=== Ría de Muros e Noia ===
The Ría de Muros e Noia is the smallest of the Rías Baixas as well as the most northern. The part of the ria known as Muros is in the area closest to the mouth (outer zone), while the Noia portion is farther in the estuary near the head (inner zone). Out of all five Rias Baixas, this is the only one not to have islands near the mouth. The principal river to join the Ría de Muros e Noia is the Tambre. Important natural features in the area are the mountain and lagoon of Louro as well as the Corrubedo wetlands.

=== Ría de Arousa ===
The Ría de Arousa is the largest of the Rías Baixas. In addition to the main ria, there is a smaller branch inlet further inland known as the Grove Inlet. The largest river to join with the Ría de Arousa is the Ulla. The Ría de Arousa is especially important in the seafood industry as it accounts for over half of the mussel farming in the Rías Baixas. As is the case with the Ría de Muros e Noia, the Ría de Arousa has two lagoons, one with fresh water and the other with salt water. In the area there is also the Parque Natural de Dunas de Corrubedo where visitors can admire sand dunes- the largest in Galicia.

=== Ría de Pontevedra ===
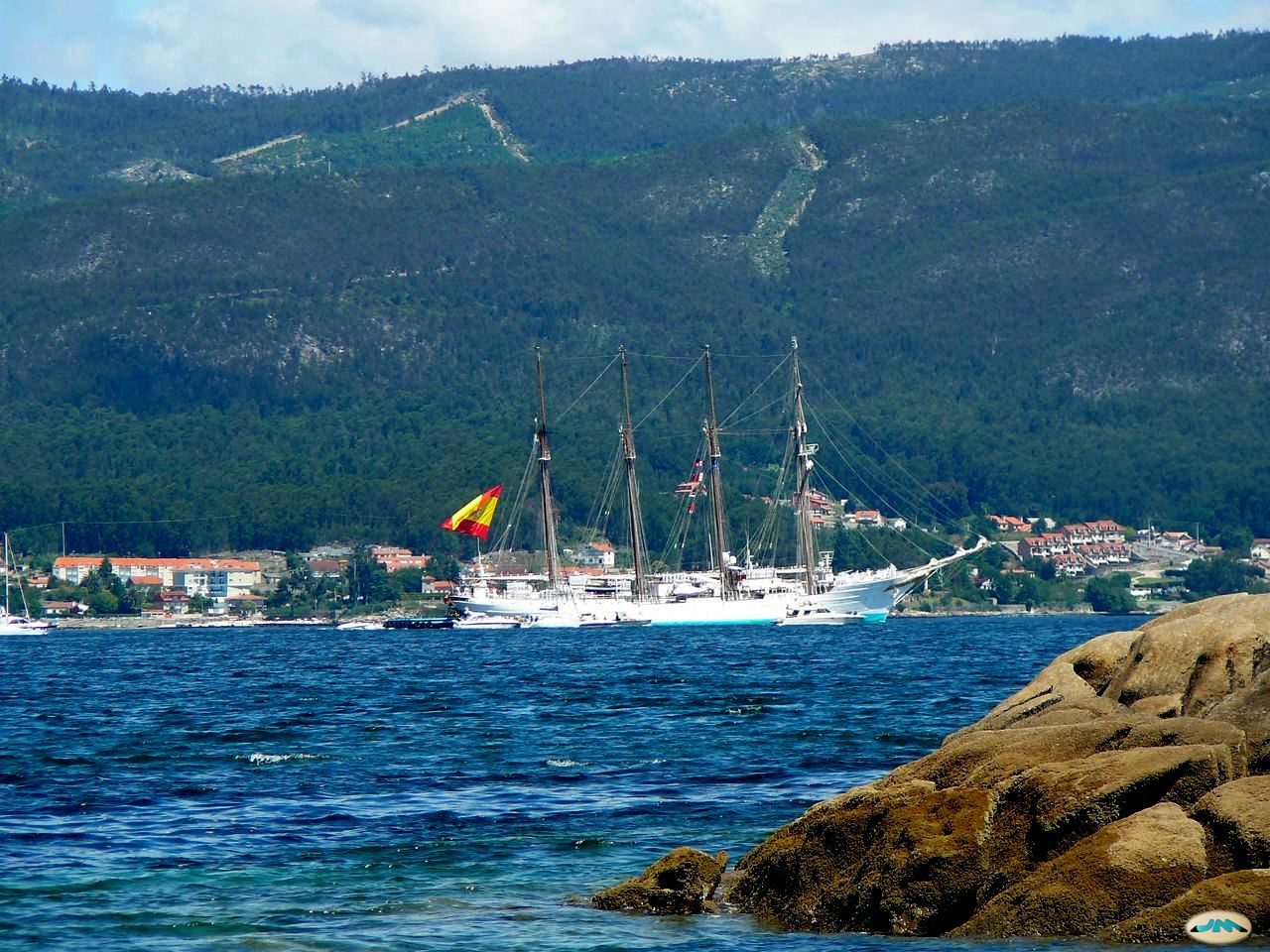
A four-masted schooner moored in the Ría de Pontevedra

The Ria de Pontevedra is the second southernmost of the Rías Baixas. Similar to the Ría de Arousa, the Ría de Pontevedra also has a smaller, distinct, inlet known as the Ría de Aldan. The Lérez River is the principal river to flow into the Ría de Pontevedra and at the mouth are islands known as Ons Island and Onza Island. Unique to the Pontevedra area are a series of rock engravings. The Ria de Pontevedra has numerous marinas such as Pontevedra, Combarro, Aguete (Marín) and Sanxenxo, the Galician summer tourist capital, which makes the Ria de Pontevedra the most touristic of the Rías Baixas. The estuary has numerous beaches on both shores such as Portocelo, Mogor, Aguete and Lapamán on the south shore and Cabeceira, Areas, Paxariñas, Canelas, Montalvo, Pragueira, Major and the famous La Lanzada on the north shore.

=== Ría de Vigo ===
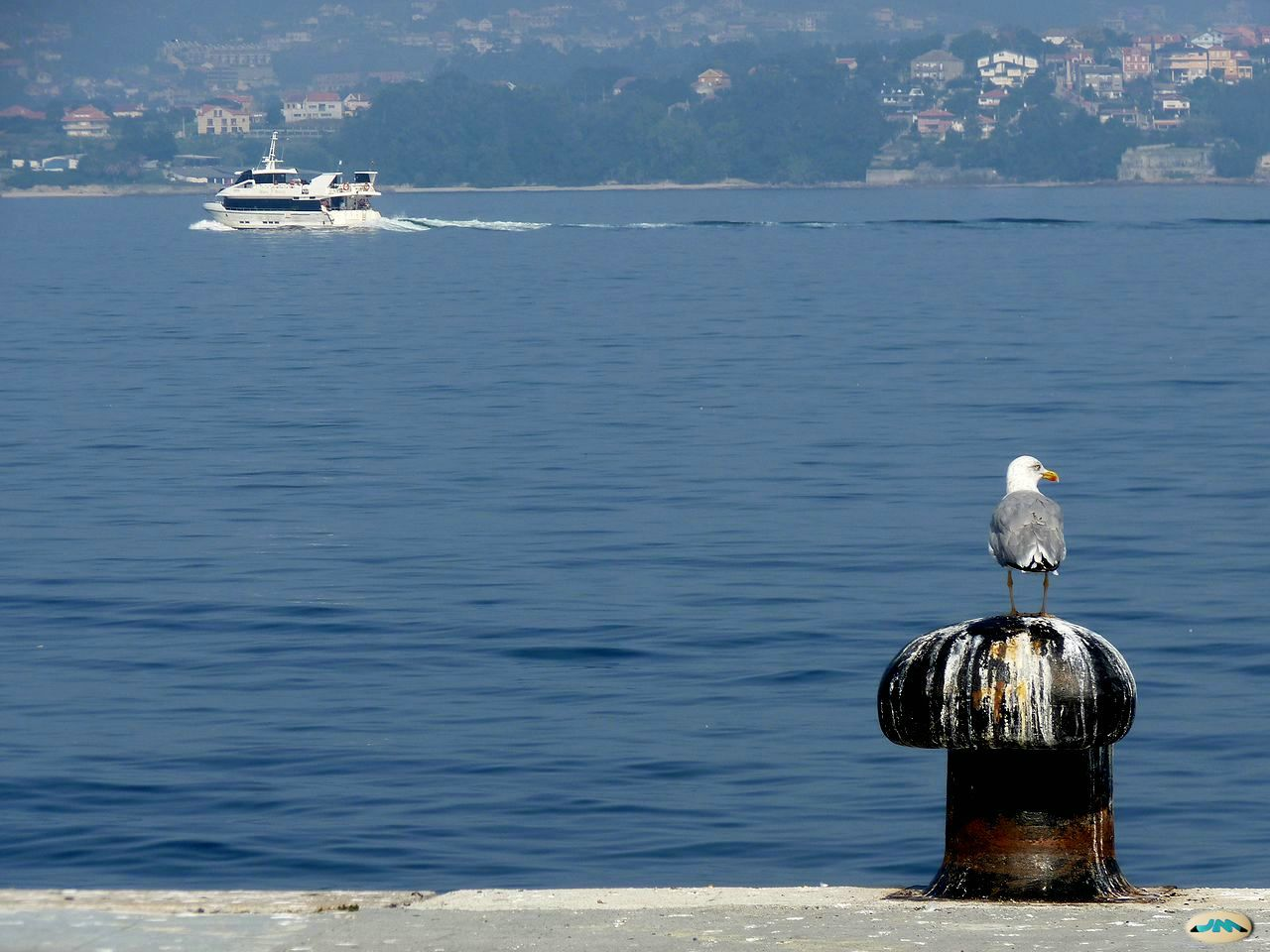
A seagull surveys the Ria de Vigo

The Ría de Vigo is the southernmost of the Rias Baixas. Within the overall ria there are two separate areas: the San Simón Inlet and the Ria of Bayona. The main river to join with the Ría de Vigo is the Verdugo. Out to sea, the Cies Islands are associated with the ría. Their location in the ocean near the mouth allow for the protection necessary to have a safe port. In addition to the port, the Ría de Vigo contains many marinas. The coastline within the Ría de Vigo has two distinct parts. The upper and inner areas are calm, while the southern coastline contains more turbulent waters.

=== National parks ===
Galicia's only national park is Parque Nacional Marítimo-Terrestre das Illas Atlánticas de Galicia (Galician for "Galician Atlantic Islands Maritime-Terrestrial National Park"). This park is made up of the Ons, Salvora, Cortegada and Cíes Islands, each located at the mouth of one of the Rías Baixas. Both the islands as well as surrounding oceanic areas are included in the park, which takes up a total of around 8,333 hectares. The designation of the area as a national park is still fairly recent, occurring on July 1, 2002. In addition to attracting visitors, the park serves as an important refuge for a variety of marine and island life. Populations of algae and shellfish are present in the water around the islands. Even large mammals such as dolphins, seals, and whales occasionally appear in the area. On the islands, many types of seabirds make their homes.

Visitors to the park can participate in taking walks, bird and wildlife watching, and occasionally camping. However, the designation of the park as a protected area prevents too many people from being on the islands at once Special permission is needed for certain activities, such as scuba diving, snorkeling, or sailing.

== Industry ==
=== Fishing and seafood ===
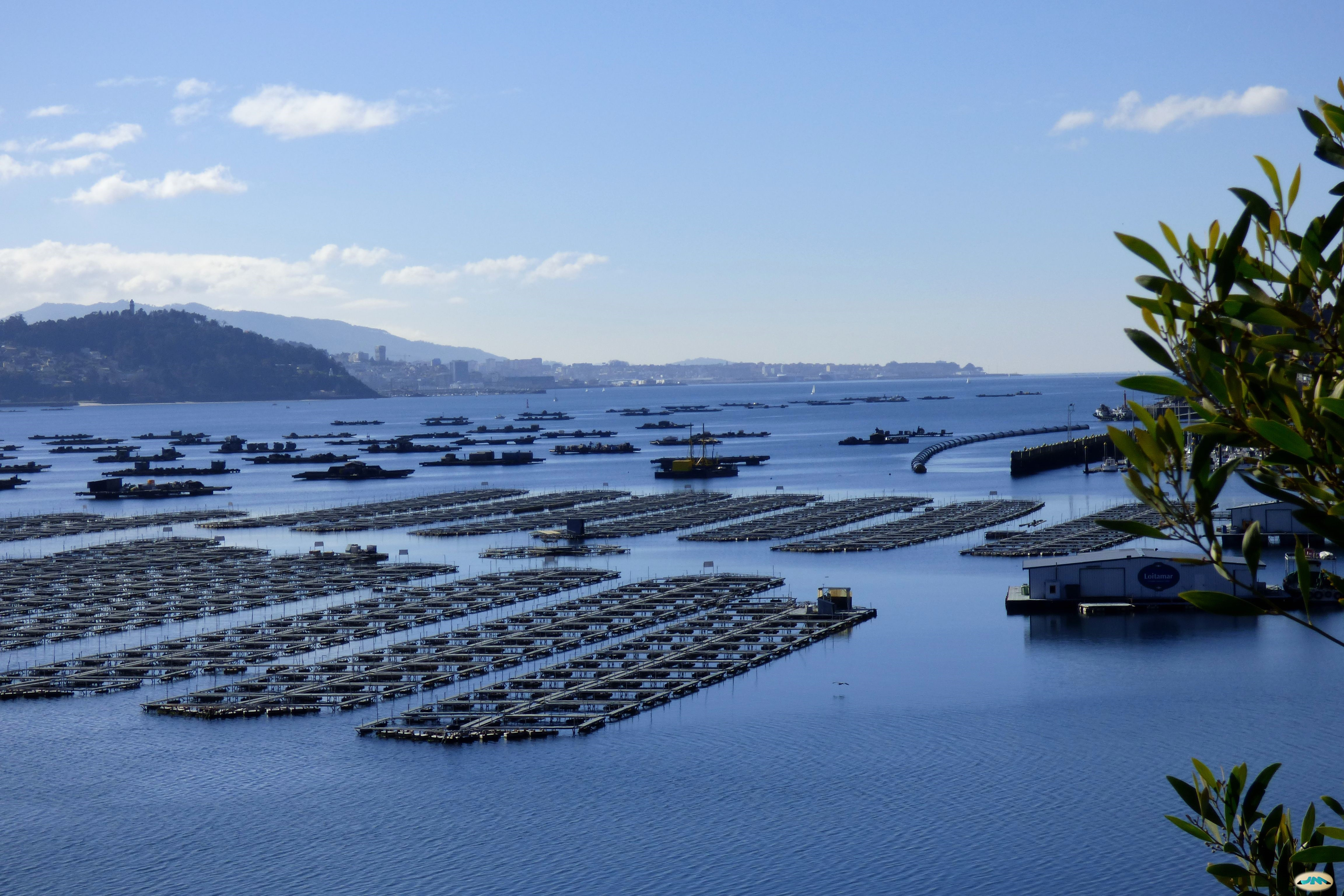
Fish farming in the Ría de Vigo near Domaio

An especially important industry to Galicia is that of seafood and a large amount of that seafood comes from the Rías Baixas. Fishing and harvesting the abundant aquatic life that live in the rias is one way of supporting the industry. Another is using the area for aquaculture such as mussel farming. The port of Vigo is especially important in serving the fishing industry. In fact, it has become the leading fishing port in Europe.

For many of the people who live in Galicia, the ocean and rías have provided their livelihood. Approximately 400,000 people make their living from fishing or performing services that help the industry. Most of the population of the region is still located near the coast and Vigo is the city with the largest population of the working class in Galicia. However, even though the fishing industry remains strong, changes in the world's oceans, such as less available fish, as well as competition with other countries have caused many young people to leave the industry and even the country.

==== Major commercial and fishing ports ====
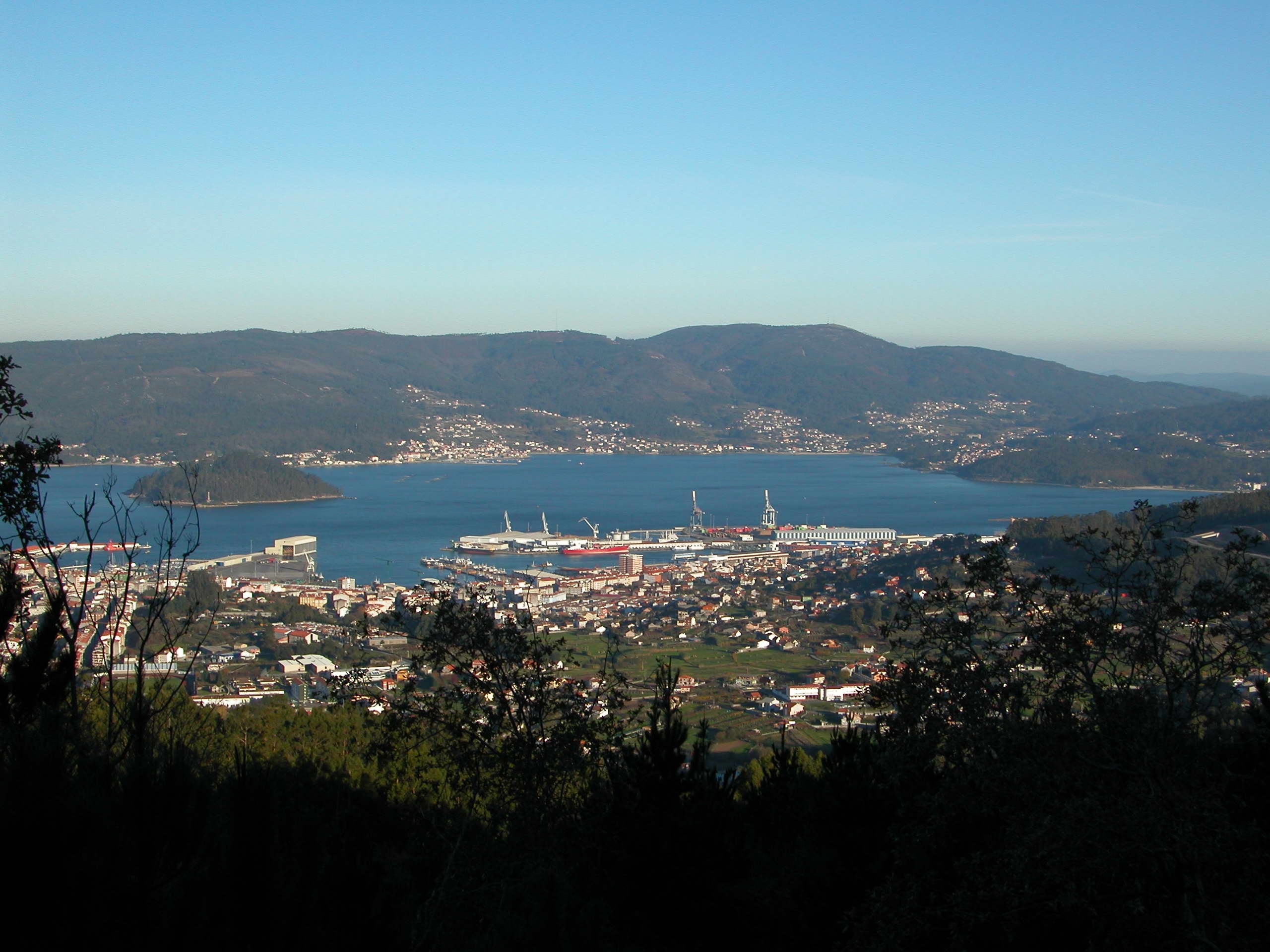
The town of Marín on the Ría de Pontevedra

- Vigo - major commercial and fishing port - - Province of Pontevedra
- Marín-Pontevedra - major commercial port - - Pontevedra Province
- Vilagarcía de Arousa - major commercial port - - Pontevedra Province
- Ribeira - fishing port - - Province of A Coruña
- Cangas - fishing port - - Pontevedra Province
- Baiona - fishing port - - Pontevedra Province
- Bueu - fishing port - - Pontevedra Province

=== Wine ===
Wine making is another industry that is important to the Rías Baixas and surrounding land. There are approximately 20,000 different vineyards in the area. A specific type of white wine, Albariño, originated in the Rías Baixas and now takes up 90% of the wine produced there. This wine is especially successful in the area because the grapes that are the main ingredient are able to withstand and even thrive in the moist, coastal, climate.

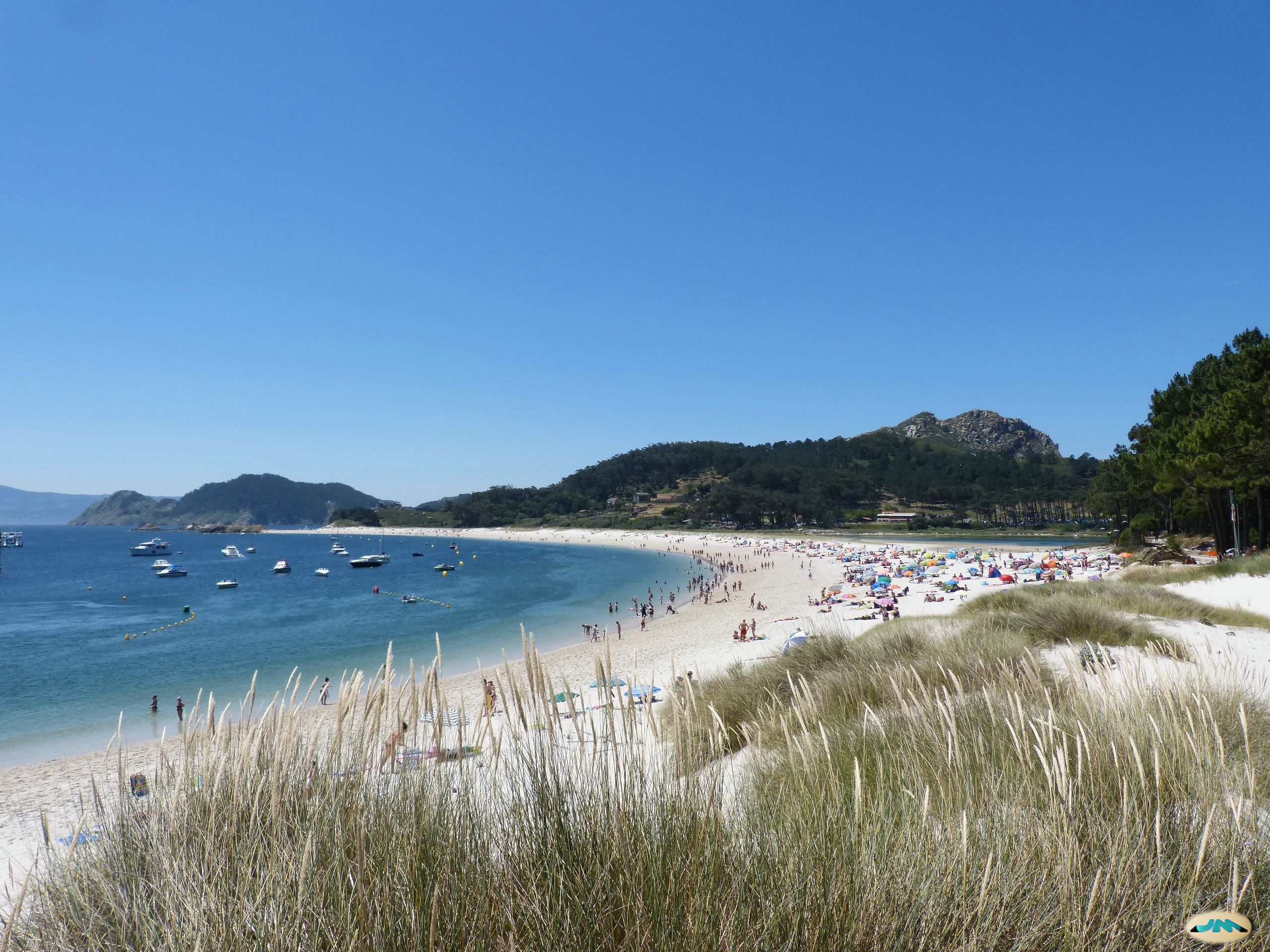
Rodas beach in the Atlantic Islands of Galicia National Park

=== Tourism ===
The Rías Baixas are an important source of tourism within Galicia, even more so than the Rías Altas. A large draw for tourists is the expansive coastline that results from the nature of the rias. This coastline also leads to many beaches. The most important historic city is Pontevedra. In the Ria de Pontevedra and the Ría Vigo there are a lot of different beaches. Furthermore, the cliffs just off shore offer extensive views. Naturally, many water and boating activities are also a central attraction for tourists visiting the Rías Baixas. The many towns located near the rias also offer added interest. Each town is distinctive, but churches, lighthouses, and manor houses are a common and popular feature. The food in the Rías Baixas, taken locally from the ocean and rias, is claimed to be very high quality and also attracts tourists.

== See also ==
- The Upper Rias (also "Rias altas") with its biggest city port in Ferrol.
- The Death Coast (also "Costa da Morte") with its biggest city port in A Coruña.
- A Costa do Marisco, Galicia (Spain)
- La Lanzada Beach
- Montalvo Beach
