= Espasante =

Fishing port in Spain

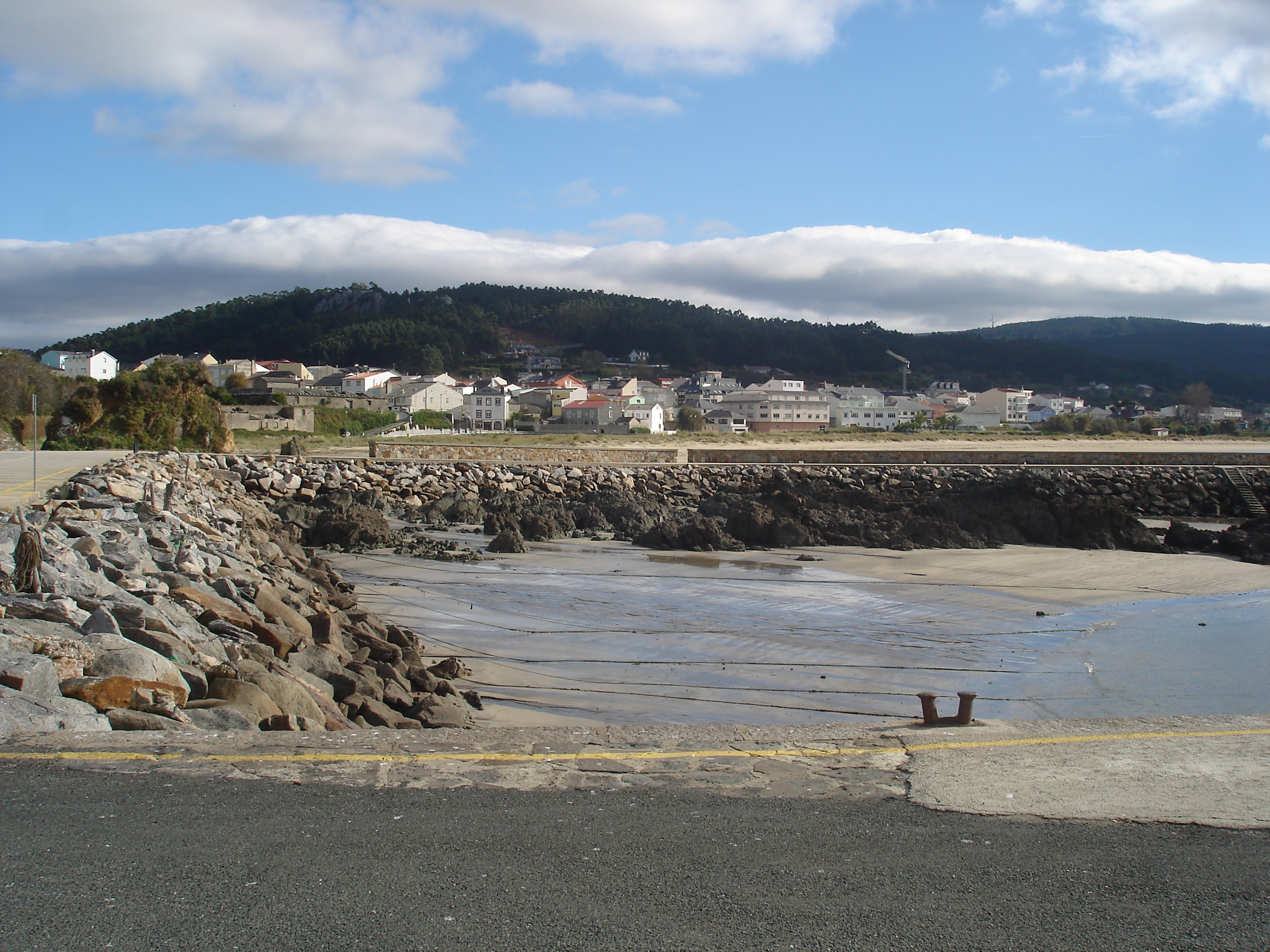

- Location within Galicia
- Coordinates: 43°43′N 7°48′W

Espasante is a fishing port in the Ferrolterra borough of Ortigueira in north-western Spain. From this port, which is near the Ria of Ortigueira and the fishing port of Cariño, trawlers leave to fish for tuna, cod, haddock and other seafood.

- Fishing port
- Sport port
