= San Cibrao =

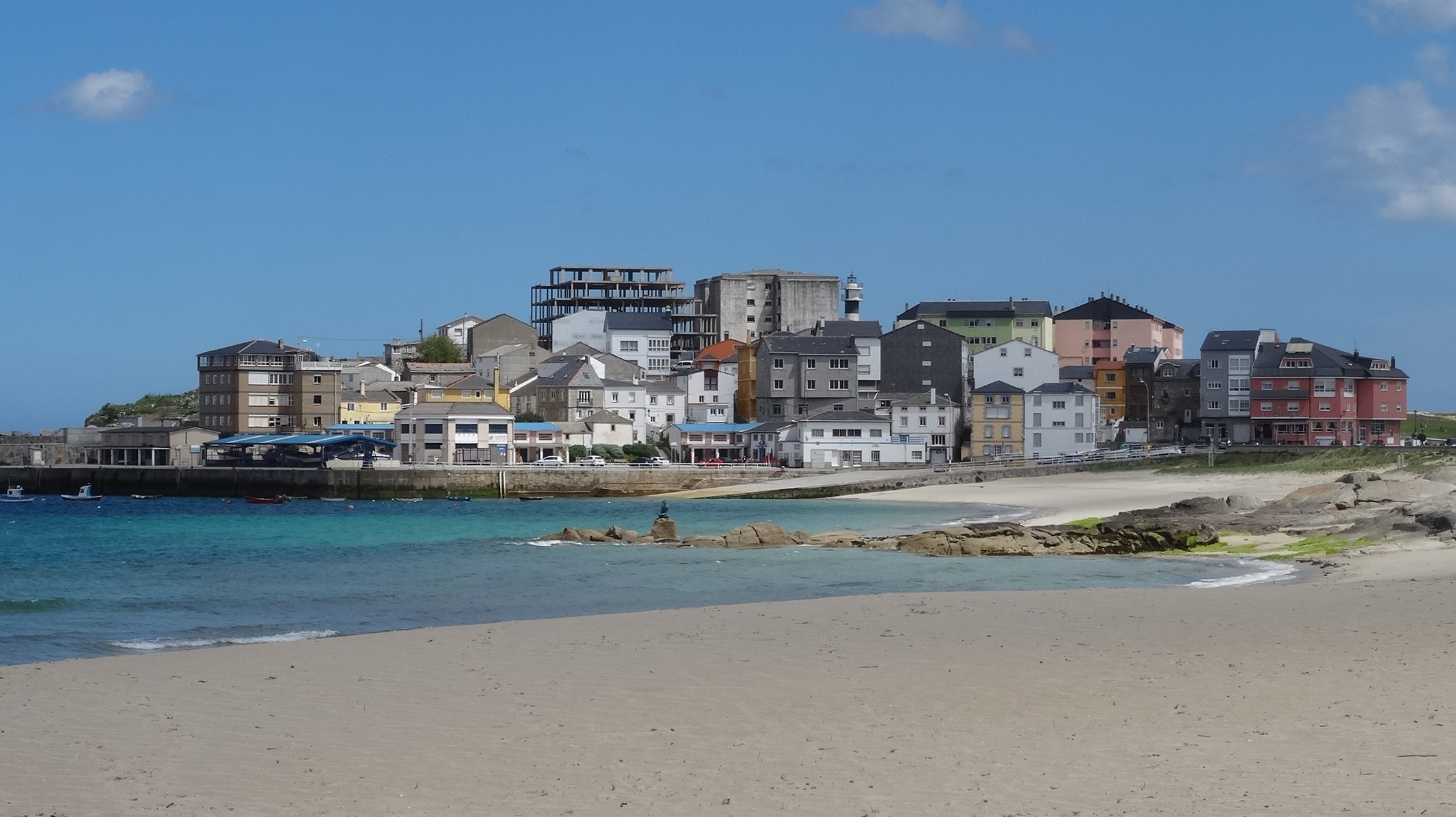

- Seal
- Nickname: San Cibrao Concello de Cervo
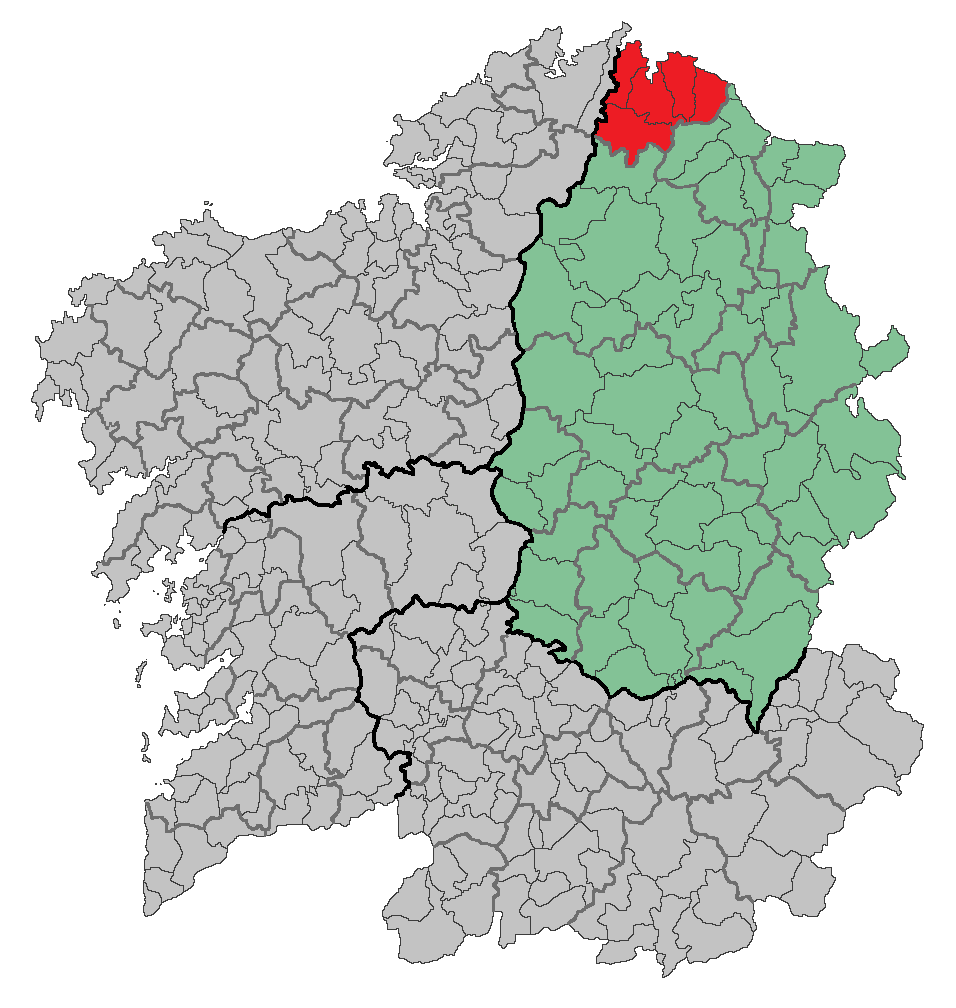

- Location within Galicia Location within Spain
- Coordinates: 43°42′07.08″N 7°28′05.64″W
- City Council: Region of A Mariña Occidental

Government
  - Alcalde (Mayor): 1
- Website: http://www.concellodecervo.com/

San Cibrao (Galician; Spanish: San Ciprián) is an industrial and fishing town, part of Cervo (which is both a settlement and municipality of the Lugo Province) in Northwestern Spain. The population of San Cibrao is about 3,000 in July and August and about 2,000 year-round.

== Port of San Cibrao ==
- Commercial port
- Fishing port
- Sport port

== History, tourism and general information ==
During the High Middle Ages caravels were built in the port. The area does not draw many tourists; the regional economy continues to depend on fishing and on an aluminium plant owned by Alcoa.

The nearby peninsula has fine sand beaches. It is generally undeveloped and receives strong north-easterly winds throughout the winter, which makes the comarca or administrative unit of la Mariña Lucense, like much of the Asturian and Basque coast, excellent for surfing and water sports.

Part of the town of San Cibrao lies on the "Peace Peninsula" (Peninsula de la Paz) which is surrounded by the Cantabrian Sea, whose waters in this area typically reach a high summer temperature of 18 °C; there are five beaches in the area.

As of 2004, neither the shellfish and fish populations, nor any seafood related industries seems to be still affected in any way by the contamination from the Prestige oil spill

The fiesta of A Maruxaina is celebrated on the second Saturday of August. It is related to a popular legend about a siren who lives on some small islands, Os farallons, near San Cibrao. This festival has been distinguished by the National Centers of Cultural Interest. Most of the townspeople dress on this day as Maruxainos, that is, in costumes that resemble the dress of days past. Ritually, at noon, the mariners bring the siren from the islands onto shore, were in front of the museum they create a mock-trial to judge the Maruxaina on whether she is good or bad. After this the townsfolk serve a potent brew of "Queimada".

== Industries ==
- Bauxite mining and Alcoa's alumina refinery.
- Fishing port.
- The Royal Factory of Sargadelos in Cervo nearby San Cibrao (Since 1791); one of the oldest and most renowned manufacturers of fine pottery in Galicia. This is also a tourist destination.

== See also ==
- Ferrol – City and naval station in northwestern Spain.
- Isaac Díaz Pardo - Galician intellectual (born 1920) strongly attached to both Sargadelos and Cerámica do Castro.
