= Cedeira =

- Municipality
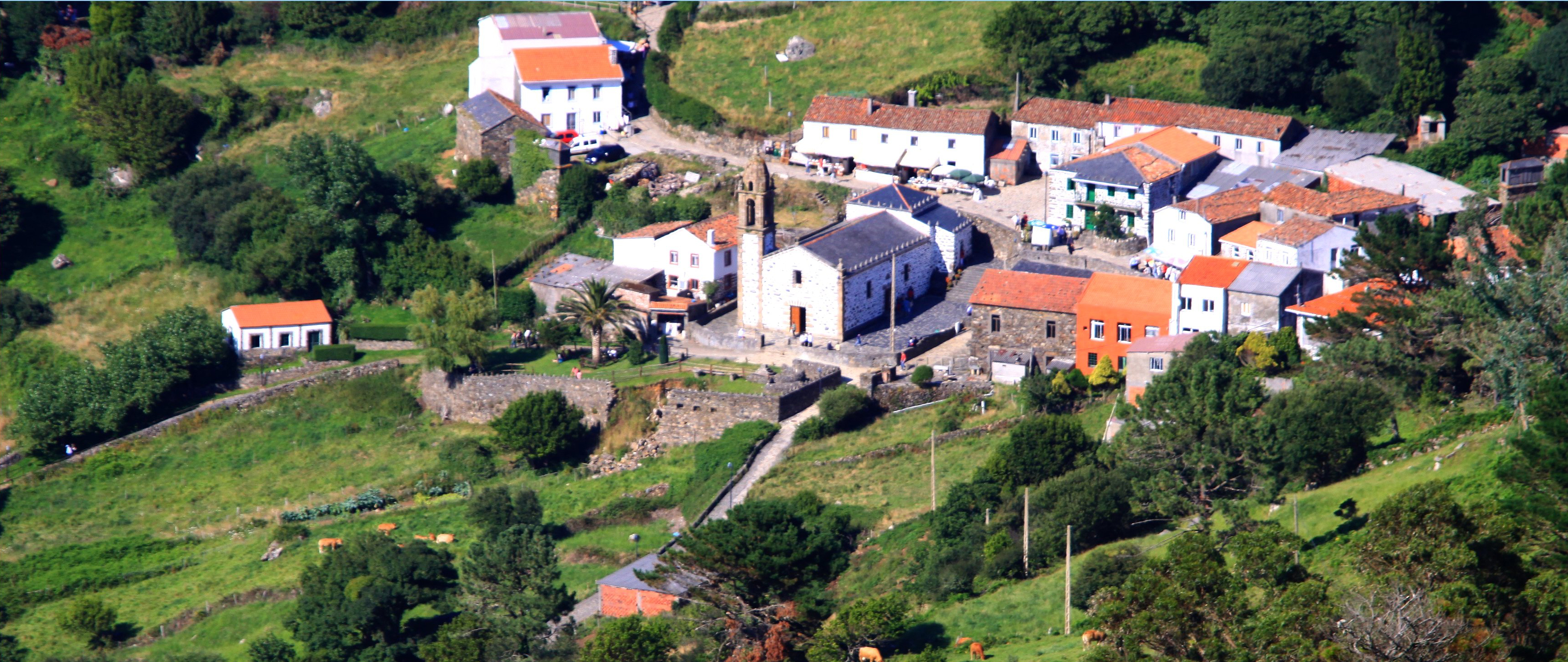
- Parish of San Andrés de Teixido.

- Flag Coat of arms

- Location in Spain
- Coordinates: 43°39′N 08°03′W
- Country: Spain
- Autonomous community: Galicia
- Province: A Coruña
- Comarca: Ferrol

Government
  - Mayor: Pablo Moreda Gil

Area
  - Total: 85.86 km^{2} (33.15 sq mi)
- Elevation: 137 m (449 ft)

Population (2025-01-01)
  - Total: 6,547
  - Density: 76.25/km^{2} (197.5/sq mi)
- Time zone: UTC+1 (CET)
  - Summer (DST): UTC+2 (CEST)
- Website: Official website

Cedeira is a municipality in the province of A Coruña in the autonomous community of Galicia in northwestern Spain. It is situated in the northern coast of the Rías Altas. Cedeira has a population of 6,626 inhabitants (INE, 2022).

== Etymology ==
All scholars agree that the place name Cedeira derives from a pre-existing Latin word cetaria, which alludes to marine fish. As no coinciding words seem to exist in the traditional lexical heritage of Galicia nor does it seem to have ever existed as a common name in the Gallaecian language, the toponym is most likely from the Roman period. However, the hypothesis that the name and the town of Cedeira have Roman origins cannot be confirmed categorically, owing to lack of historical documentation.

The question is, does 'Cedeira' derive from a classical Latin noun or a later vulgar homonym of the late Empire. The first possibility is that it derives from the substantive neuter plural of classical Latin, which, like the feminine cetariae, meant 'ponds or nurseries where large fish are raised'. The more credible alternative is that it comes from a late Latin feminine adjective cetaria, formed from cetus – whale or large fish – + arius, which combined would mean "petaining to whales or large fish", because of the abundance of Galician names that contain the suffix -eiro or -eira come normally from adjectives.

The oldest documented mention of the place appears in a document from 868, which reads:

In Era DCCCLXVIII ... Vincentium in Cetaria et insula Selima cum sua ecclesia. sca. Maria in Carantra.

[In the year 868... The church of Vincent in Cetaria and the island of Selima with its church.]

— López Ferreiro, Antonio, Historia de la Santa Apostólica Madre Iglesia de Santiago, Vol. 1, Appendix, p. 6, Sálvora, Santiago de Compostela, 1883)

If the name of the town was originally an adjective applied to a generic name –villa or terra, it would be used in adjectival agreement, as in a document from 1111:

... in terra Cetaria, villam de Brexo, cum medio de Soutelo et hereditatem in Villa de Bentosa...

[... in the land of Cetaria, the villa of Brexo, with the middle of Soutelo and the inheritance in the Villa of Bentosa...]

— Cal Pardo, Enrique, El monasterio de San Salvador de Pedroso en tierras de Trasancos, p. 235, Diputación Provincial, A Coruña, 1984

Before the 12th century, this toponym had to undergo several more phonetic changes into the Romance language form of the name appeared in a document from 1114,

... in terra Cideira uillar de Filgosa

[... in the land of Cideira, the village of Filgosa]

— S. Montero Díaz, Colección diplomática del monasterio de S. Martín de Jubia, Boletín de la Universidad de Santiago, 7, nº 25 (1935) p. 62

The initial i can be attributed to an unfruitful phonetic change, repeated in the spelling of the hamlet, Galician: Felgosa, as Filgosa.

That certainly also seems to have occurred in the case of Torrecedeira, in Pontevedra, one of the four other known 'Cedeiras' in Galicia, that are also all located on the coast, where the sighting of cetaceans, such as whales, or large marine fish, was not unusual.

Finally, in support of the toponym Cedeira signifying the presence of whales or large fish in the estuary and off the coast, this Cedeira is only the largest of four Galician: Cedeiras, which are all spots located on the coast of the autonomous community, from where the sighting of cetaceans – i.e. large marine animals – was common even in the 18th century.

== Parroquias ==
- Cedeira (Santa María do Mar)
- Cervo (Santalla)
- Esteiro (San Fiz)
- Montoxo (San Xiao)
- Piñeiro (San Cosme)
- Régoa (Santa María)
- San Román de Montoxo (San Román)

== Demography ==
From:INE Archiv

== Economy ==
Travelers from Cedeira travel to South Africa, Terranova in Canada or the Irish Box to fish. Most of the fish, mainly tuna, is canned and stored in warehouses locally for later distribution to different parts of Spain and Europe.

Farming, horse breeding and timber production, together with services are the main economic activities. Since the late 1980s Cedeira has developed into a coastal resort.

Wind-mill parks are common in Ferrolterra, particularly in the boroughs of Cariño, Cedeira and A Capela.

== Santo André de Teixido ==
Nearby is the site of Santo André (or San Andres), a pre-Christian pilgrimage site, with a holy well. Parts of the chapel at San Andres dates from the 12th century, although most of the structure was designed by Miguel Lopez de la Peña and built in 1789. The earliest reference to Christian pilgrimage there comes from a 1391 manuscript, in which a woman from nearby Viveiro says:

Iten mando yr por min en romaria yr per min a Santo Andre of Teixido, porque Ilo tenno prometudo, tenno, et que le ponnan enno seu altar hua candea commo he hua muller de meu estado

The cliffs of San Andres are described as the highest in Europe.

== Culture ==
Cedeira hosts a small Medieval Fair in one of its main squares each year.

=== Gastronomy ===
Para peixe fresco Vigo, para chocos, Redondela, para camaróns Moaña, para marisco Cedeira.

[For fresh fish Vigo, for cuttlefish, Redondela, for shrimp Moaña, for seafood Cedeira]

Since 2003, Cedeira holds the Festa do Percebe in July or early August, to celebrate the local maritime gastronomy. Festival participants can learn to cook percebes traditionally.

agua ferver, percebe votar, agua ferver, percebe sacar.

[boil water, throw in the percebes, reboil the water, take out the percebes.]

— Eating in Cedeira, Fascinating Spain

Since 2025, the Campeonato Mundial del Percebe (Goose Barnacle World Championship) has been held here. This is an international gastronomic event established to celebrate the profession of the percebeiros (barnacle harvesters) and showcase the relevant culinary excellence.

== See also ==
List of municipalities in A Coruña
