= Cariño =

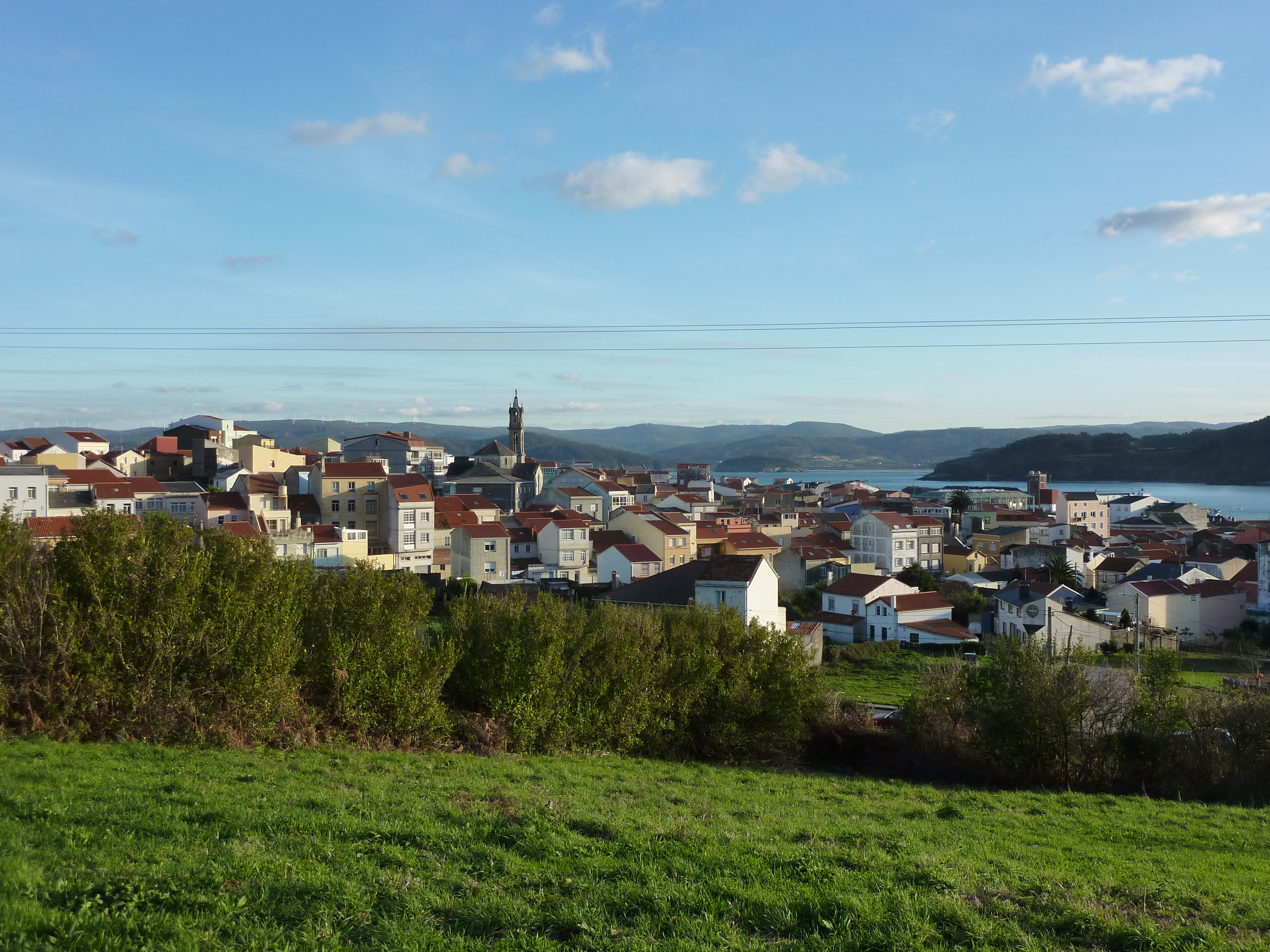
- Town view.

- Flag Coat of arms

- Location in Spain
- Coordinates: 43°44′29″N 07°52′09″W
- Country: Spain
- Autonomous community: Galicia
- Province: A Coruña
- Comarca: Ortegal

Government
  - Mayor: José Miguel Alonso Pumar

Area
  - Total: 47.19 km^{2} (18.22 sq mi)
- Elevation: 613 m (2,011 ft)

Population (2025-01-01)
  - Total: 3,661
  - Density: 77.58/km^{2} (200.9/sq mi)
- Time zone: UTC+1 (CET)
  - Summer (DST): UTC+2 (CEST)
- Website: Official website

Cariño is a municipality in the province of A Coruña, in the autonomous community of Galicia, northwestern Spain. It is situated in the north of the province and located on the Ría de Ortigueira y Ladrido (Ortigueira and Ladrido tidal inlet). Cariño has a population of 3,661 inhabitants (INE, 2025).

Cariño and Cedeira's coast has some of the highest cliffs in Europe.

== See also ==
List of municipalities in A Coruña
