= Silgar Beach =

Beach in Pontevedra, Spain

- Beach
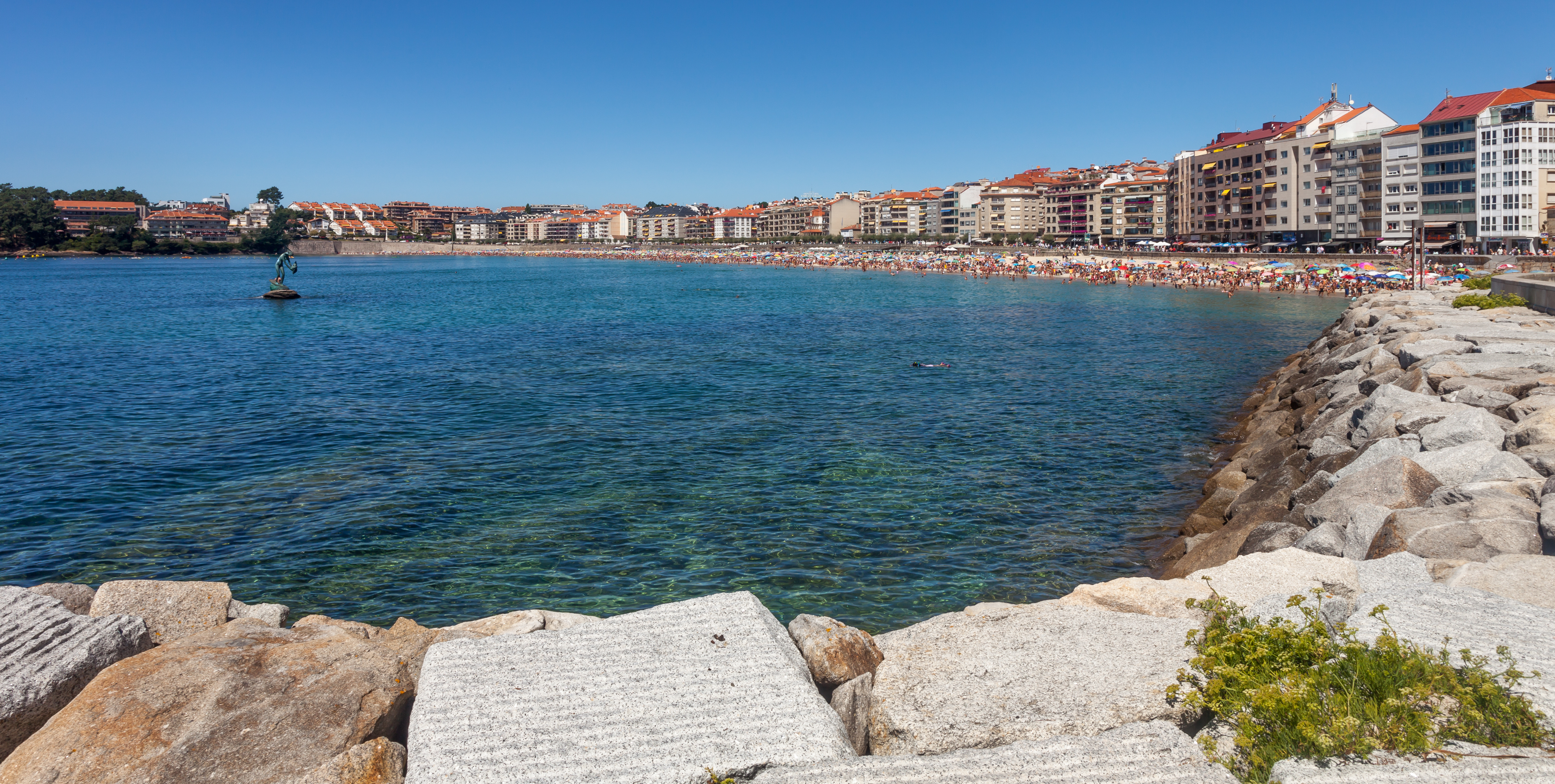
- Silgar Beach with the Madama sculpture in the sea

- Location within Spain
- Coordinates: 42°24′03″N 8°48′45″W
- Location: Sanxenxo

Dimensions
  - Length: 750 metres (2,460 ft)
  - Width: 80 metres (260 ft)

The Silgar beach is a Galician beach located on the urban coastline of the municipality of Sanxenxo in the province of Pontevedra, Spain. It is 750 metres long and is bordered from end to end by the eponymous promenade.

== Description ==
The Silgar beach is an urban beach located in the ria of Pontevedra. It is separated from Baltar beach, in the civil parish of Portonovo, by a promontory known as Punta do Vicaño. At its right end is the large marina of Sanxenxo.

Silgar is the most touristic beach in Galicia. On this beach, on a rock a few metres from the coast, is the statue of Madama, the work of the artist Alfonso Vilar Lamelas.

== Access ==
The beach is located in the centre of Sanxenxo, surrounded by a promenade.

== Gallery ==
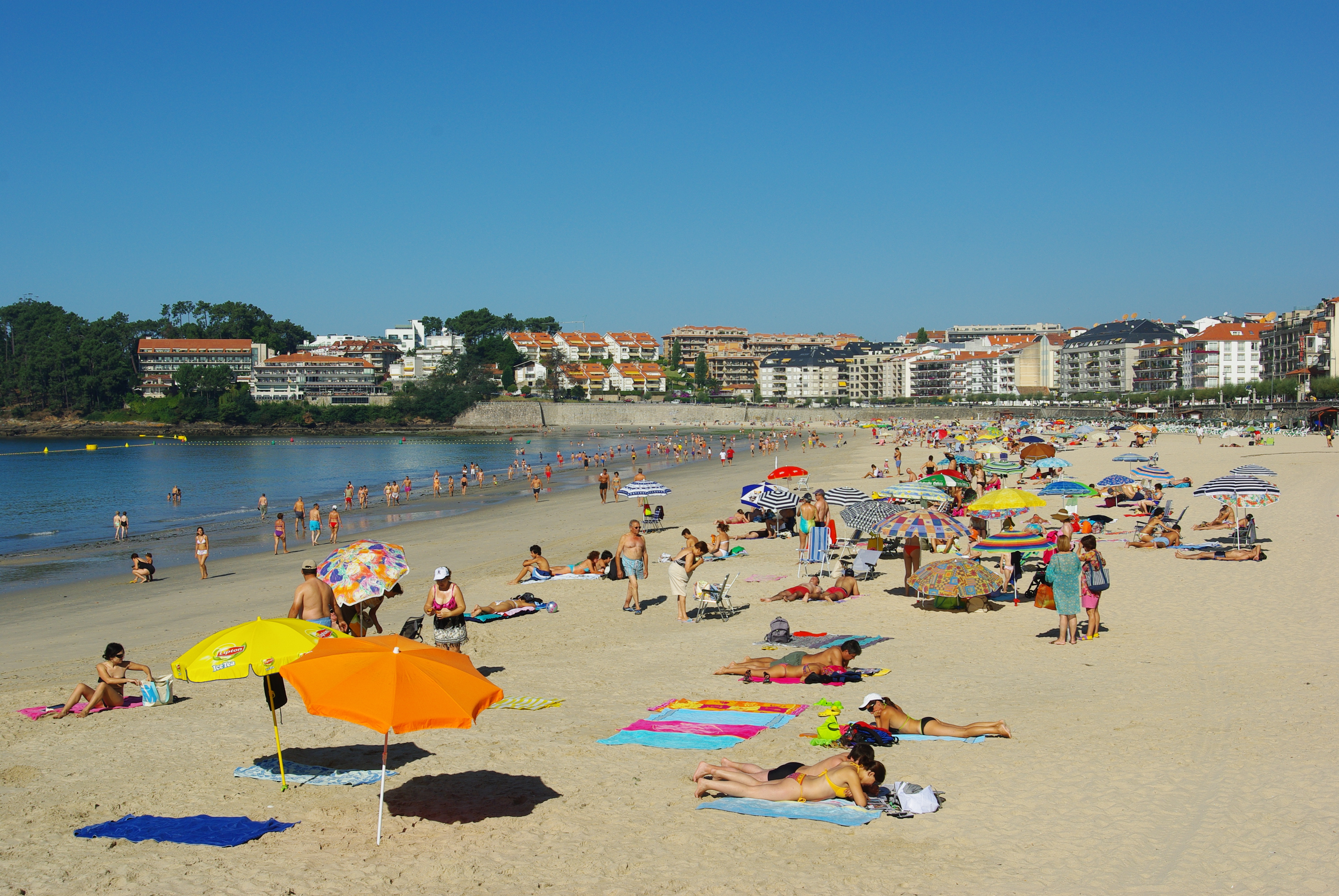

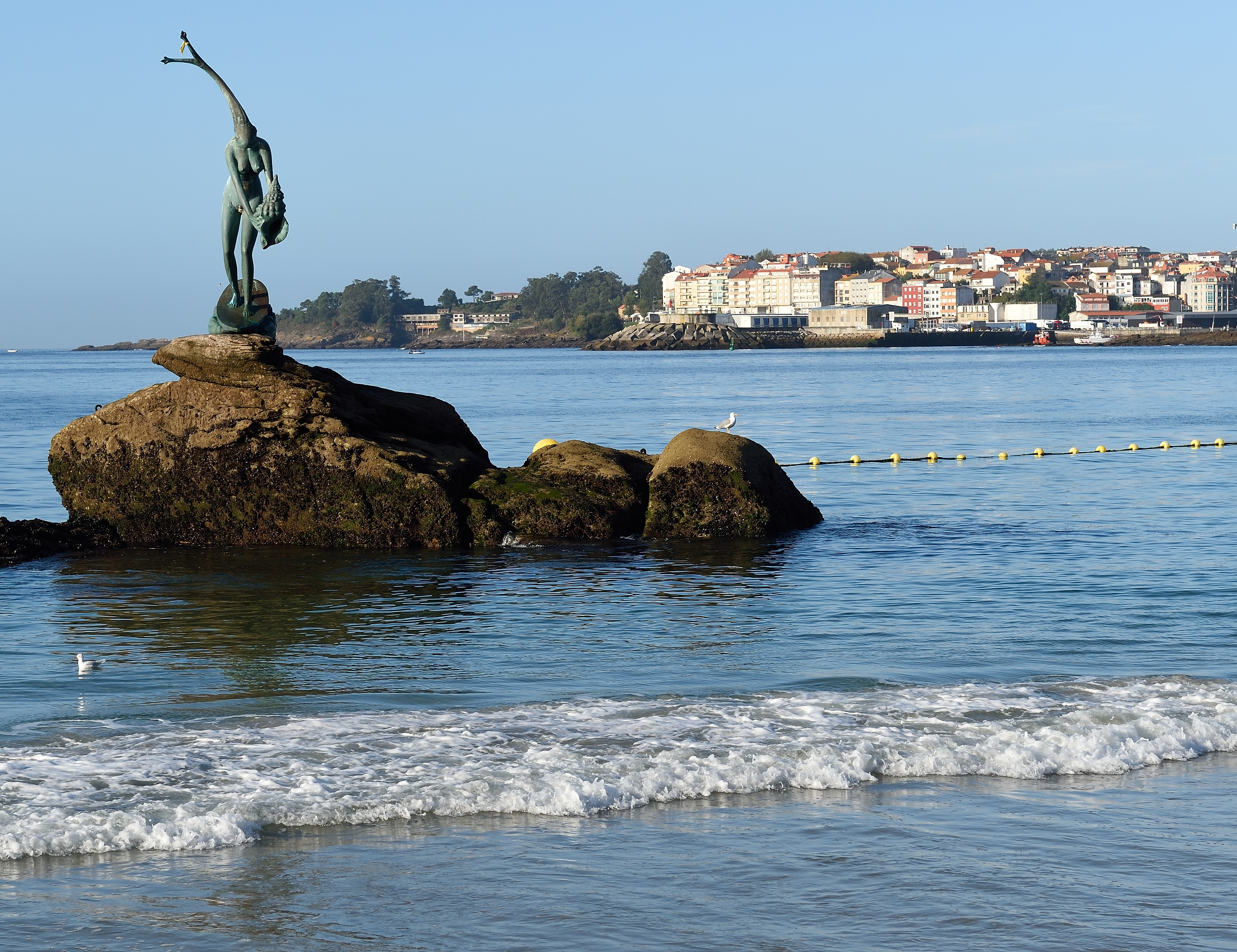

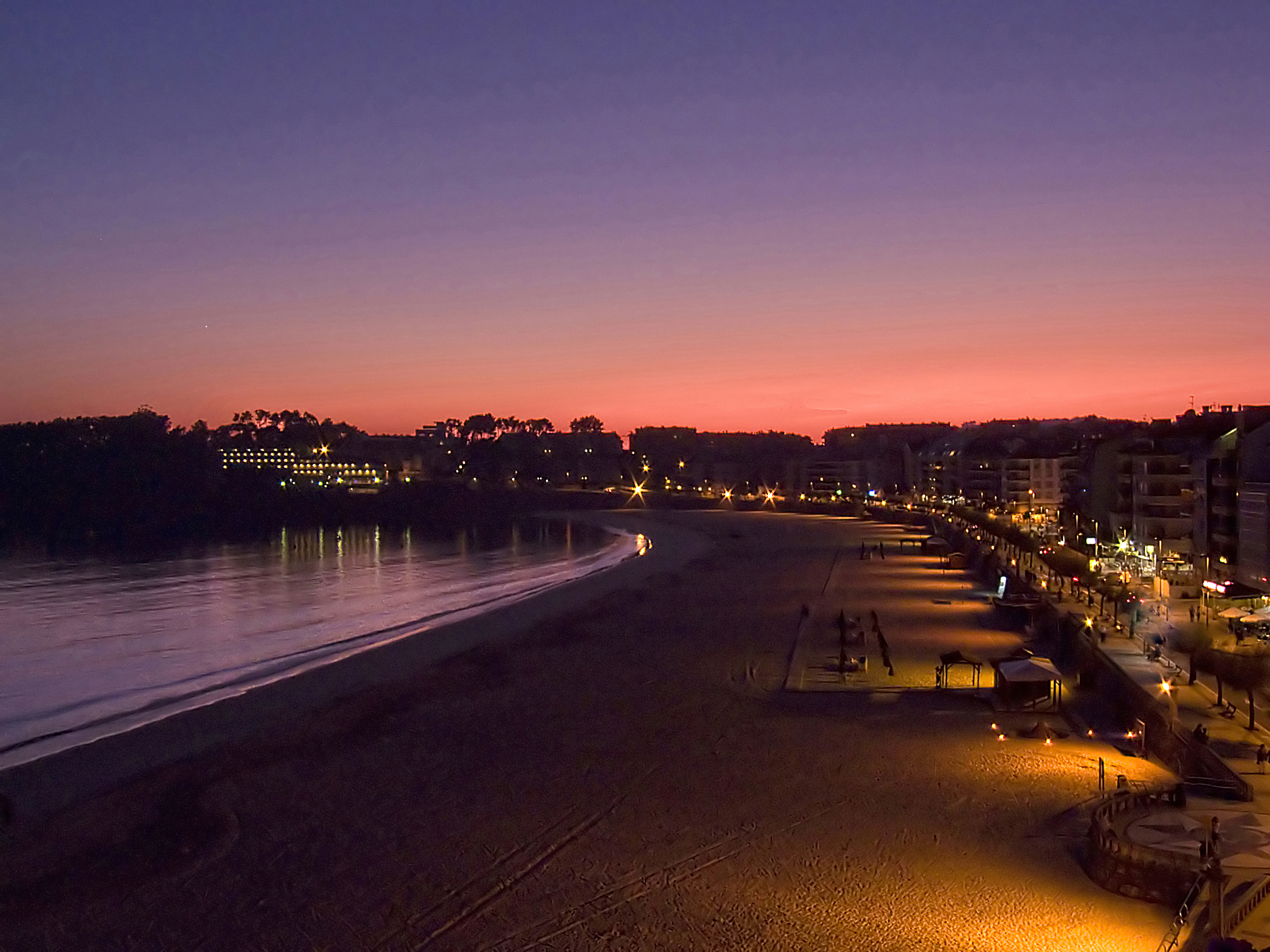

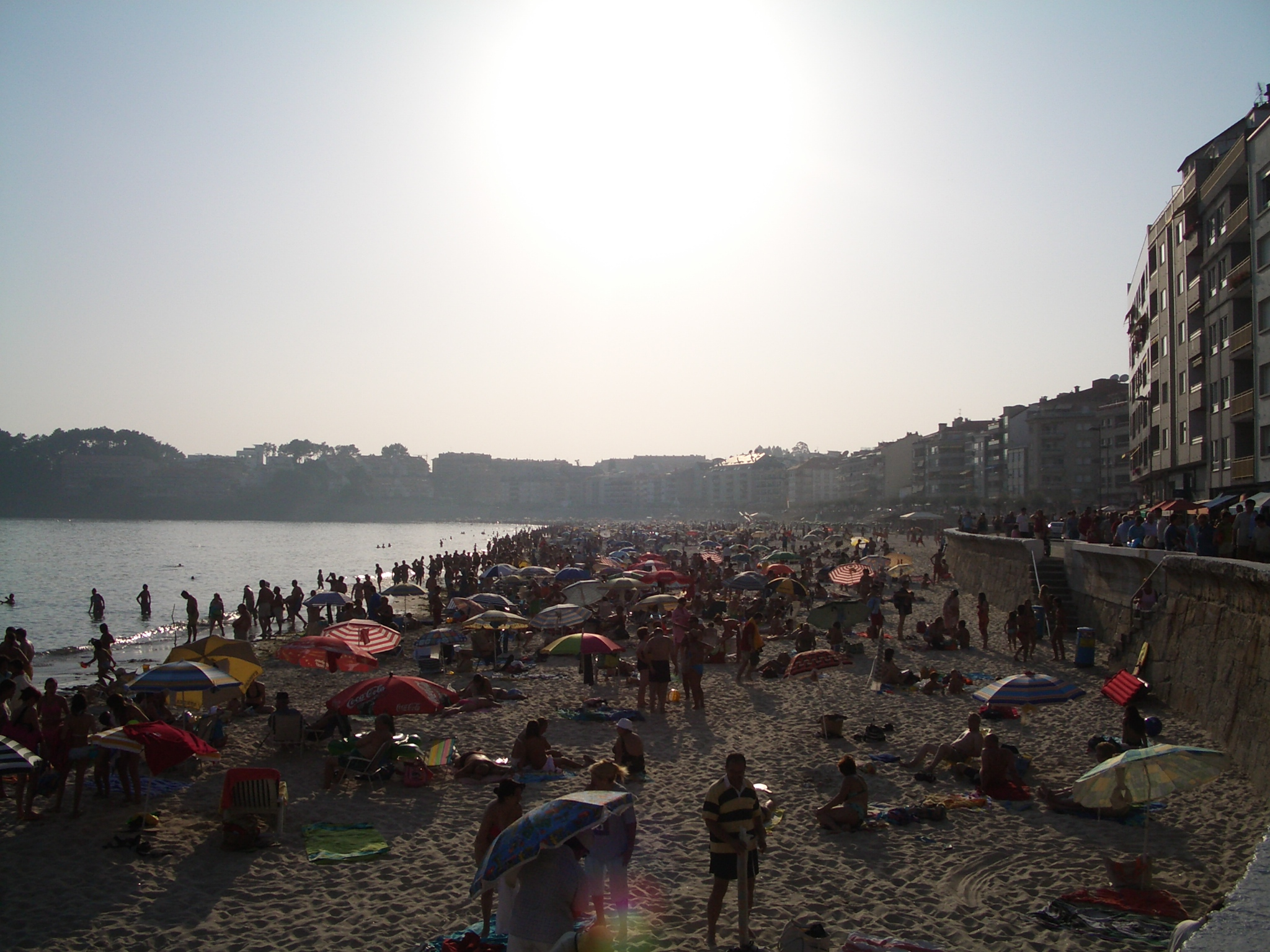

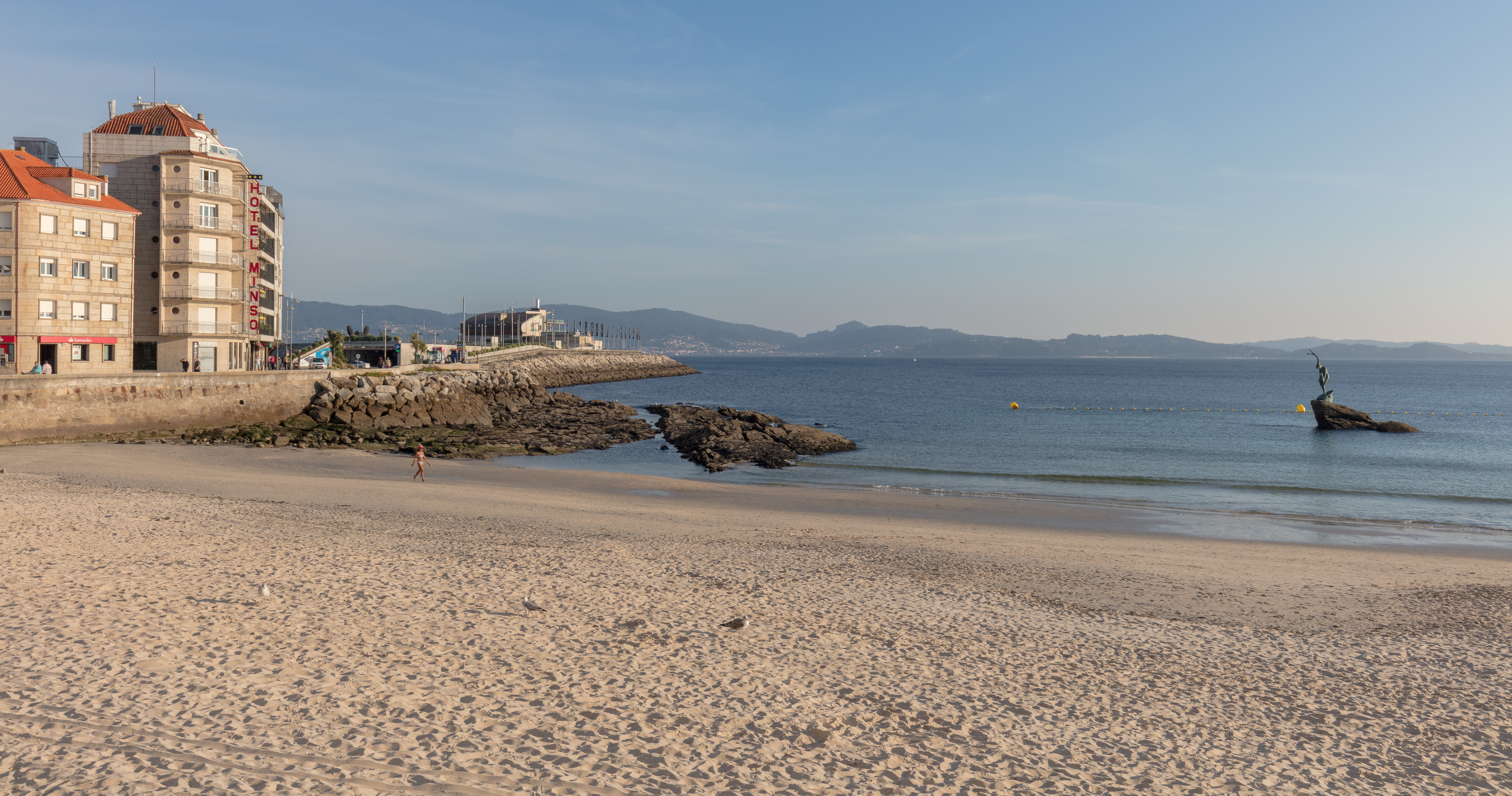

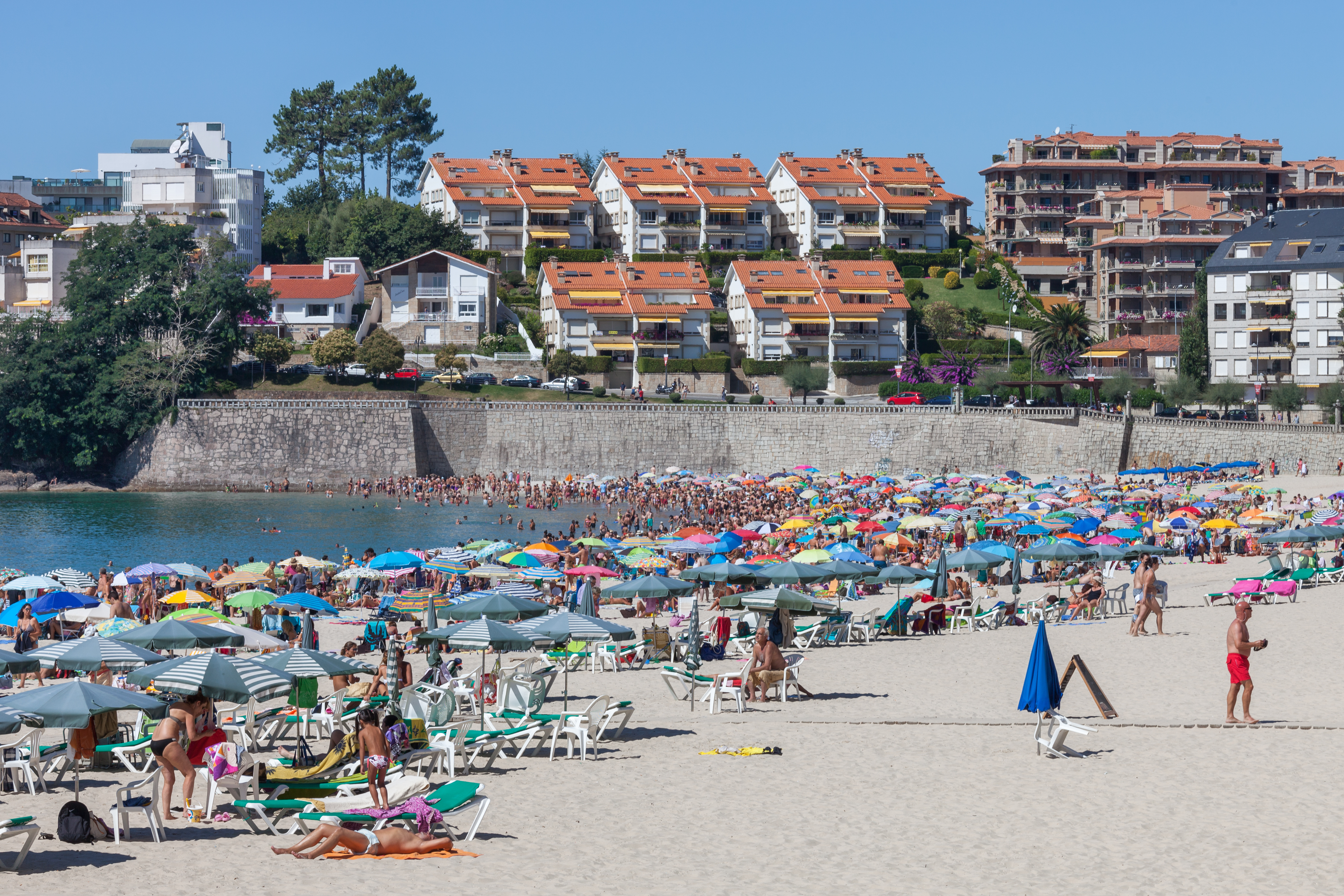

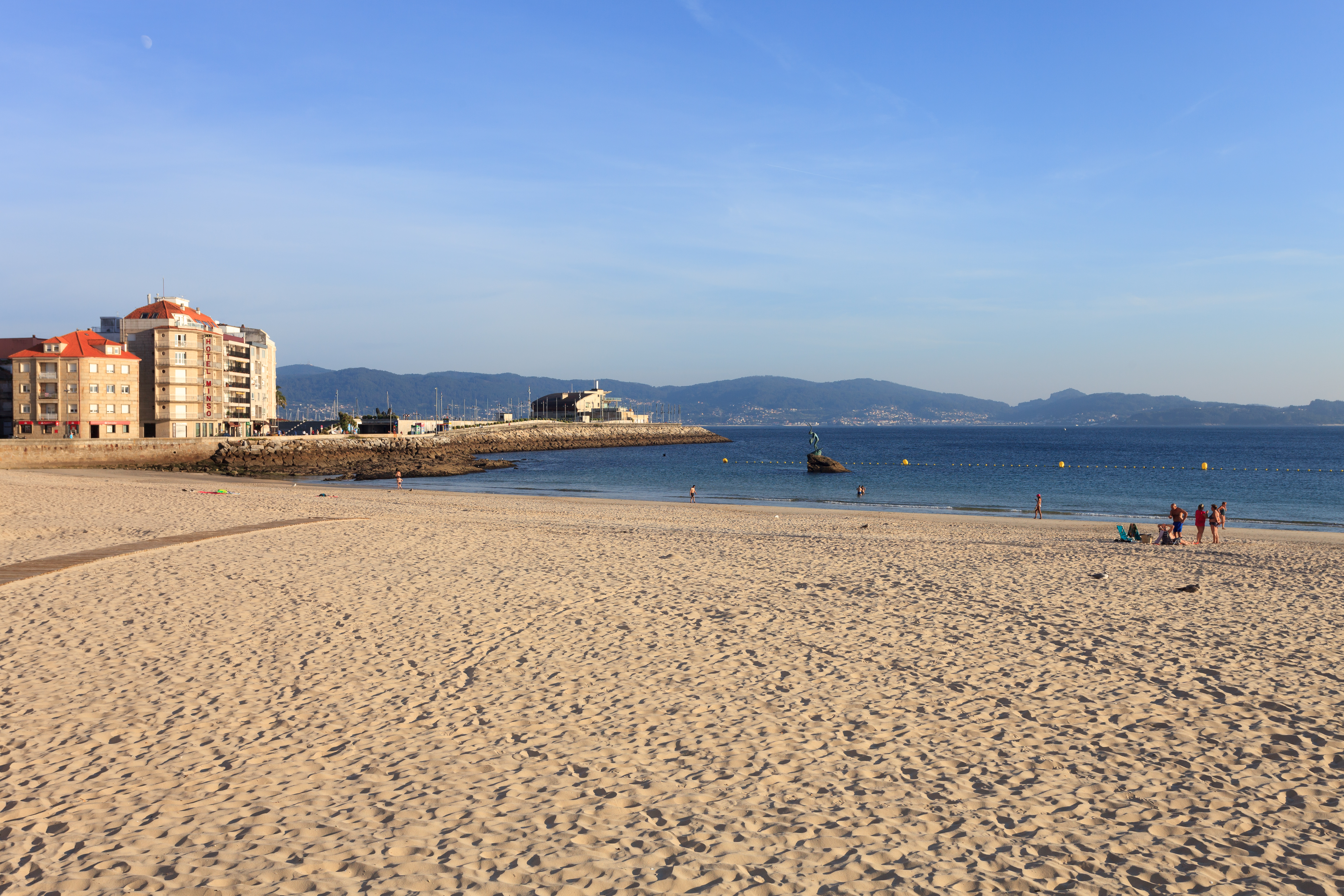

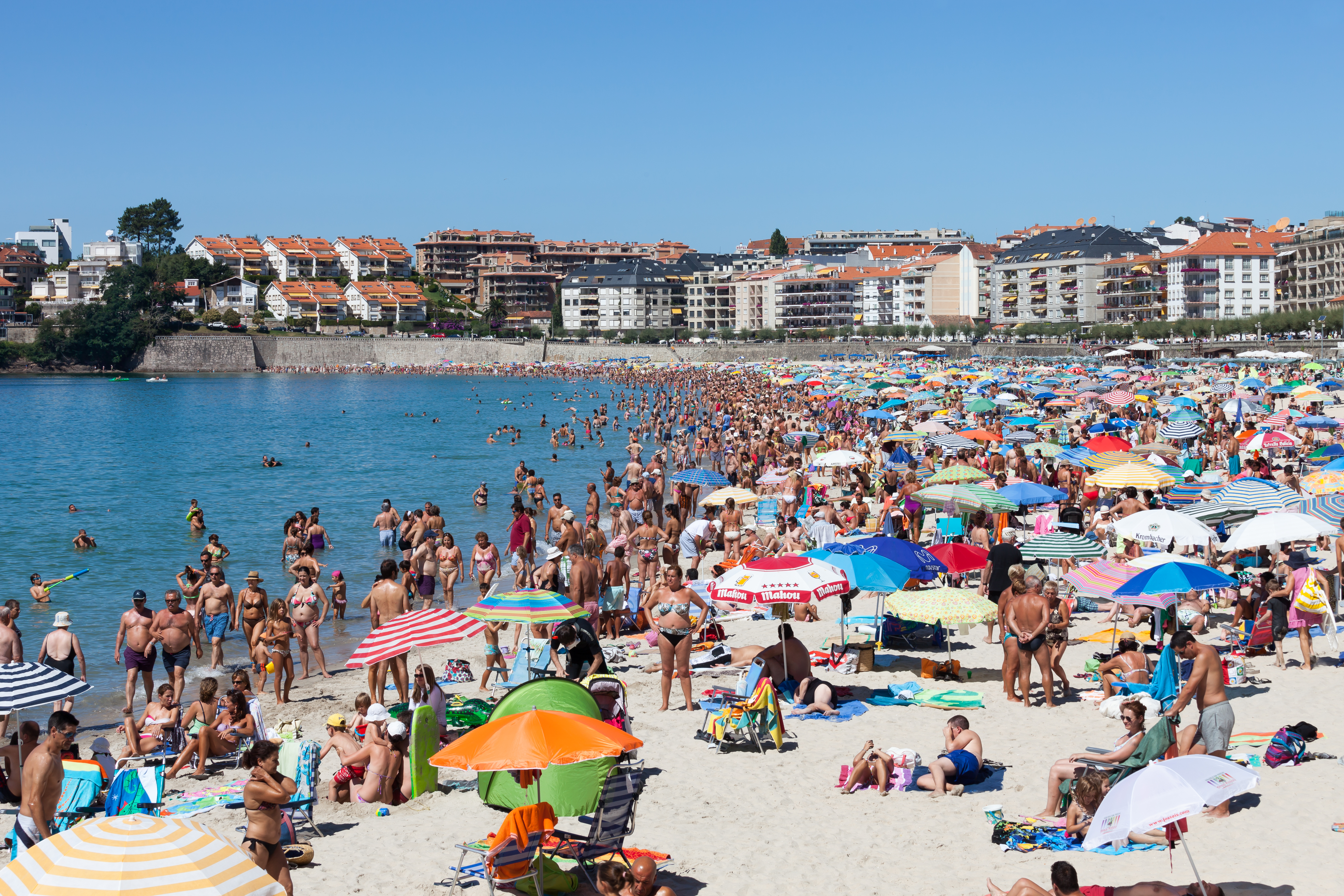

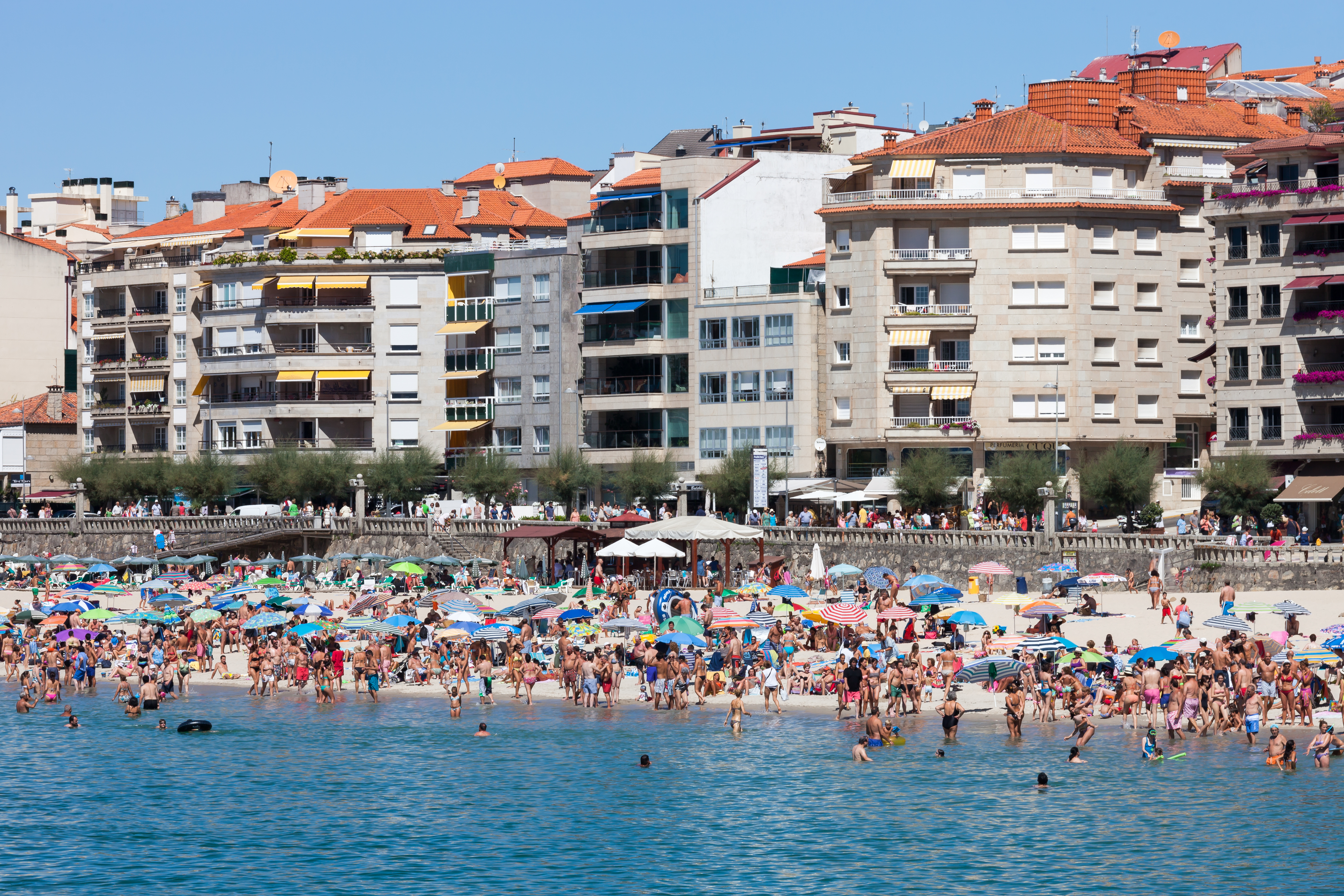

== See also ==
=== Related articles ===
- Sanxenxo
- Ria de Pontevedra
- Rias Baixas
- Areas Beach
- Montalvo Beach
- La Lanzada Beach

=== External links ===
- Photo: Night view of La Madame on Silgar beach, Sanxenxo
- Photo: Promenade, night view, Silgar Beach
