= Ria de Pontevedra =

Body of Water in Pontevedra, Spain

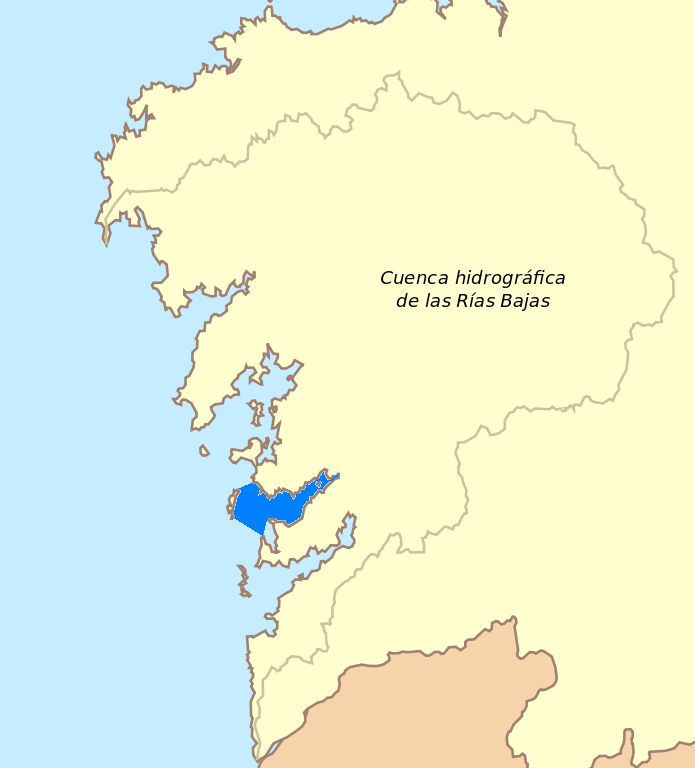
- Location in the Rias Baixas

- Location within Spain
- Location: Rias Baixas
- Coordinates: 42°23′05.1″N 8°45′00.5″W
- River sources: Lérez
- Ocean/sea sources: Atlantic Ocean
- Basin countries: Spain
- Max. length: 23 km (14 mi)
- Max. width: 8 km (5.0 mi)
- Surface area: 145 km^{2} (56 sq mi)
- Settlements: Pontevedra, Sanxenxo, Poio, Marín, Bueu

The Ria de Pontevedra is located in the Province of Pontevedra, in Galicia, Spain. It is one of the three main maritime entrances of Galicia, the Rías Baixas, the most touristic area of the region. It is also the most regular of them and the third largest of all those in Galicia with a surface area of 145 km^{2} (56 sq mi).

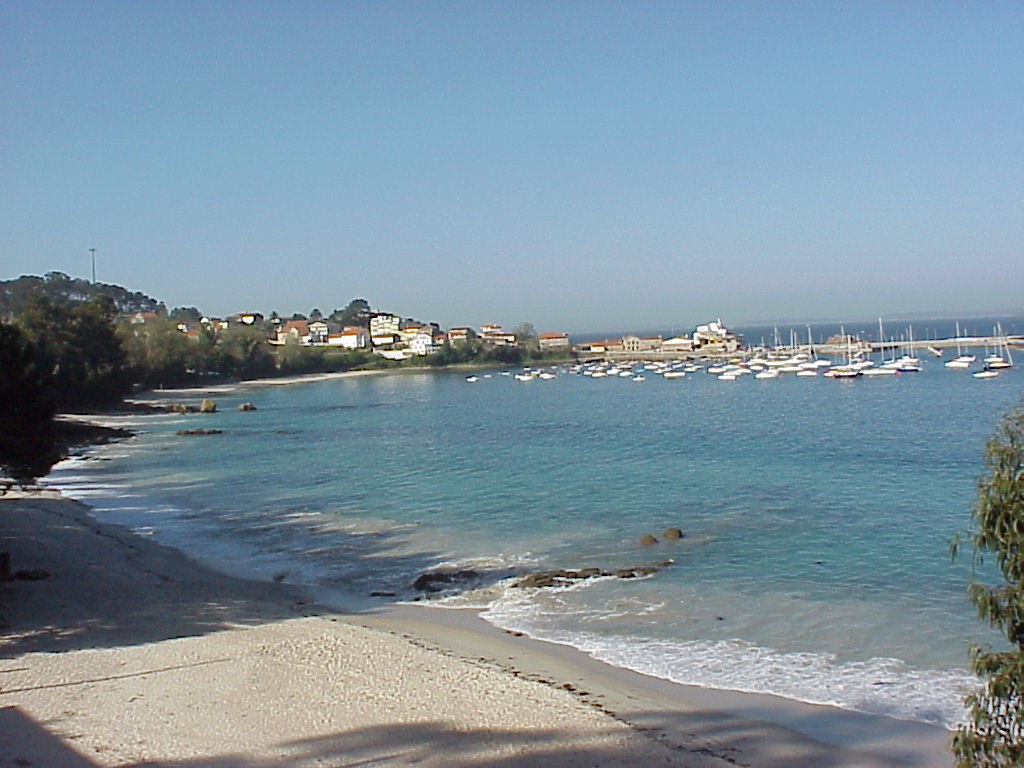
Aguete Beach in Marín

== Description ==
There are several islands in the ria, among which is Tambo Island, at the bottom of the ria, close to Pontevedra, and in its mouth is Ons Island, the largest, and Onza or Onceta Island, the smallest; the latter are part of the Atlantic Islands of Galicia National Park. At its southern end is the ria de Aldán. This ria has an approximate volume of 3,937 hm^{3} (1.390×10^{11} cu ft).

One of the main characteristics of the ria de Pontevedra is the number of mussel parks (Aquaculture) that exist.

== Geography ==
It is located in the province of Pontevedra, in the autonomous community of Galicia, in the northwest of Spain.

It is the second ria of the three in this group and at the bottom of the ria is Pontevedra, the provincial capital city and capital of the Rías Baixas. To the south of the bay is the region of El Morrazo; to the north the region of El Salnés; to the west the Atlantic Ocean and the famous Ons Island; and to the east Pontevedra, the monumental city of the Rias Baixas and the province of Pontevedra.

The river that discharges the most water into this ria is the Lérez River, with an annual average of 432 hm^{3} (1.53×10^{10} cu ft). The average annual rainfall is 1,500 mm (59 in).

The municipalities surrounding the Ria de Pontevedra are:

- on the north bank: Sanxenxo and Poio
- on the south bank: Pontevedra, Marín and Bueu.

In these municipalities live more than 200,000 inhabitants, which in the summer, thanks to tourism, can reach more than 300,000 people, since towns like Sanxenxo quadruple their population. The most populated municipality is the provincial capital, Pontevedra City, with 83,260 inhabitants, followed by Marín, with more than 24,000 inhabitants.

The Ria of Pontevedra in the atlas of Pedro Teixeira in 1634.

== History ==
4,000 years ago, there was a river valley in what is now the Ria de Pontevedra, which was later flooded by the Atlantic Ocean. In ancient times, Pontevedra, Combarro, Marín, Sanxenxo and Bueu were not by the sea. Fifteen thousand years ago, the sea began to penetrate the valley little by little, but it probably reached the present entrance to the Lérez River in Pontevedra around four thousand years ago.

According to Juan Vidal Romaní, professor of geology at the University of A Coruña, 14,000 years ago the coastline consisted of large sand dunes several kilometres west of the Ons Island, which at that time and for several millennia remained connected to the mainland. The entire configuration of the present-day Ria de Pontevedra was a succession of oak and chestnut forests, with meadows in the lower areas.

In 2018, remains of prehistoric soil, paleosol, in the form of slabs of a compact and sticky substance appeared in Mourisca, in Beluso (Bueu).

== Tourism ==
This ria is very touristic, one of the most touristic areas of Galicia, in which the municipalities of Marín, with its Military Naval School, the very touristic towns of Sanxenxo, Bueu or Poio, the city of Pontevedra, and towns such as Portonovo or Combarro, with their characteristic hórreos (pillared granaries) are located.

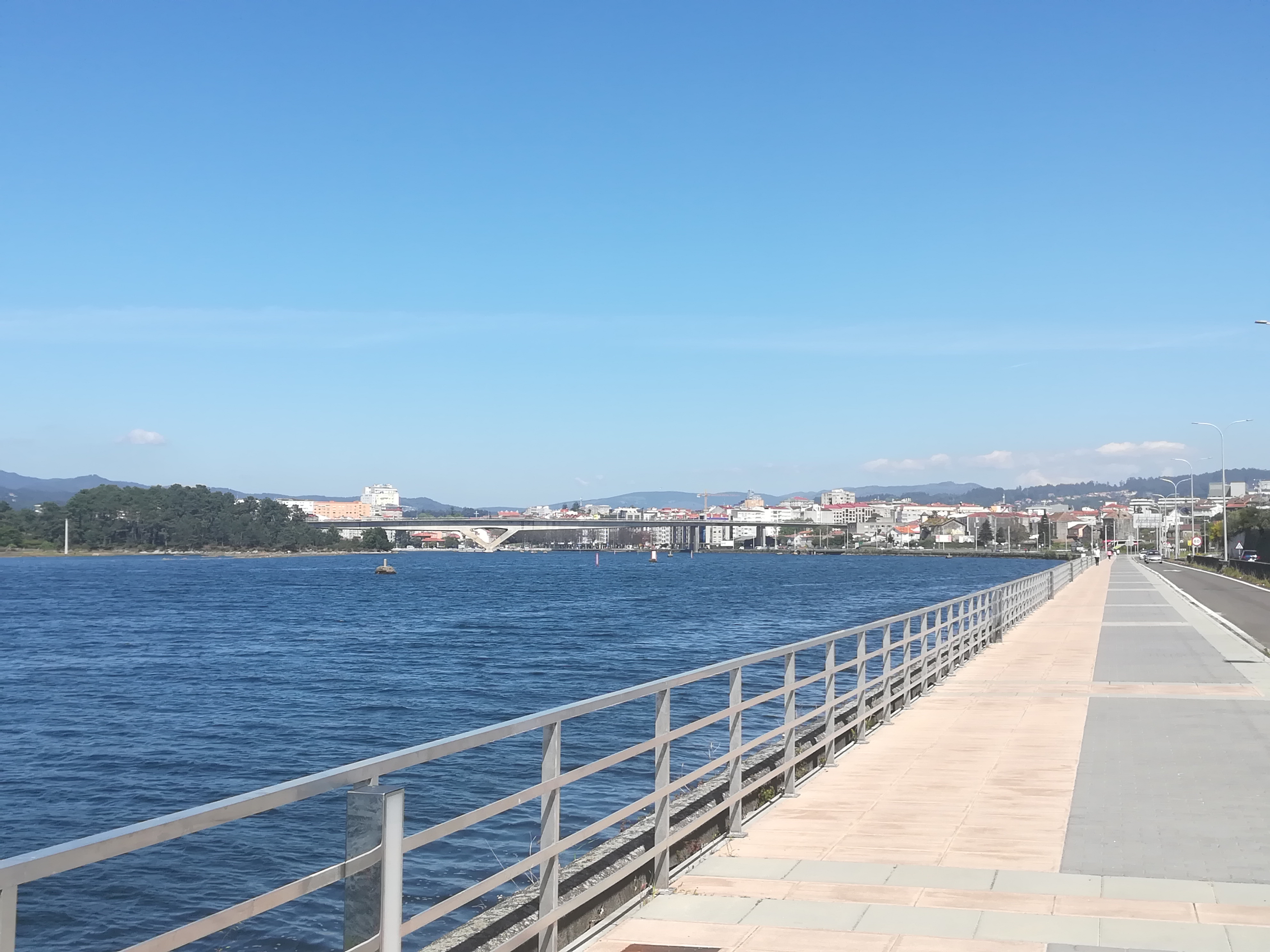
Pontevedra, capital city of its province and of the Rías Baixas, at the end of the Ria de Pontevedra

Sailing can be practised safely in its waters, with the Royal Nautical Club of Sanxenxo standing out among the facilities designed for this purpose. This is where the last Volvo Ocean's Race began. There are many viewpoints from which to appreciate the ria.

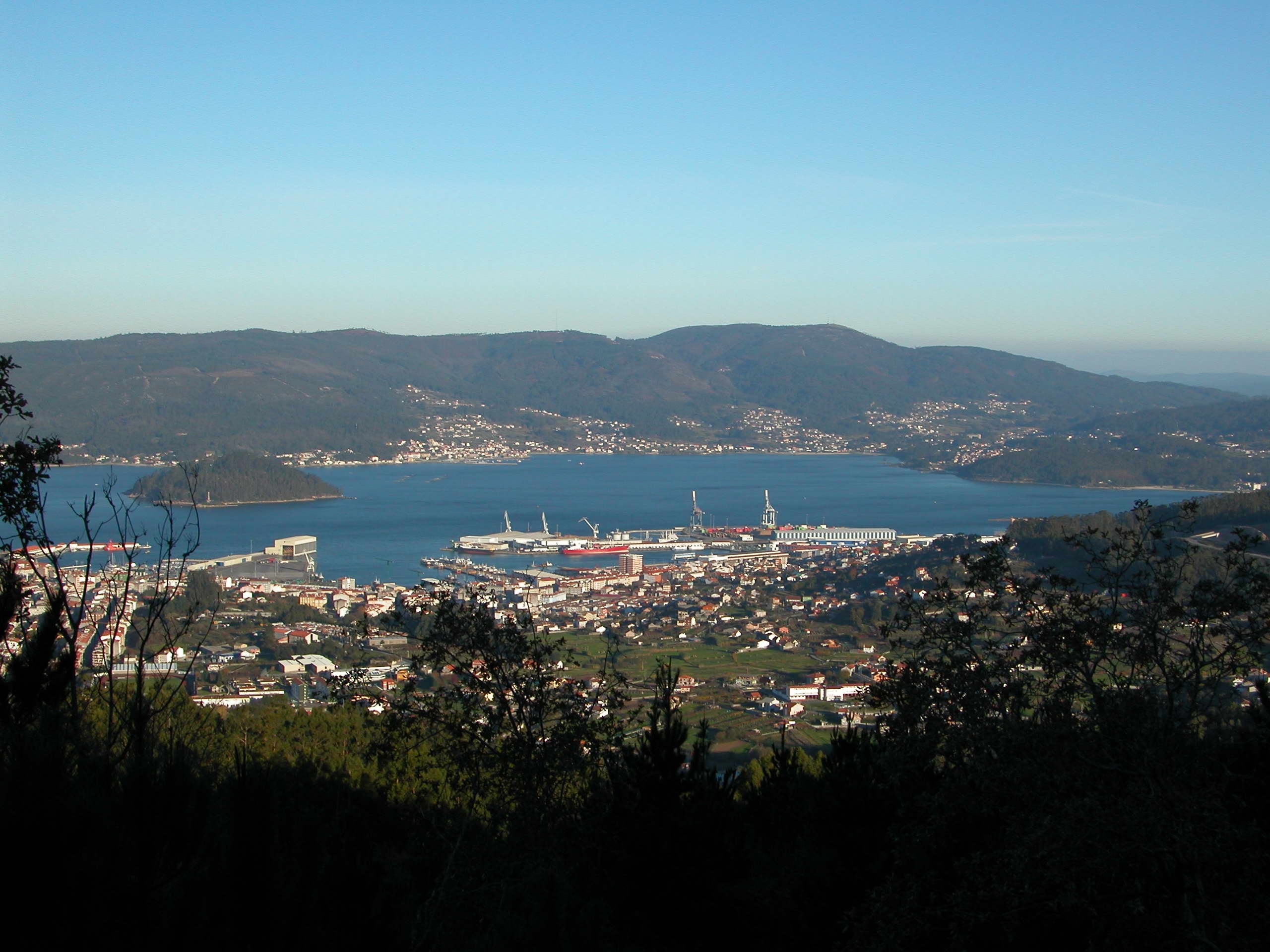
Marín and the Ria de Pontevedra

In addition, there are numerous beaches on both the north and south shores, the best known being Lapamán beach, Aguete beach, Mogor beach and Portocelo beach on the south shore and Cabeceira beach, Raxó beach, Areas Beach, Silgar Beach, Baltar beach, Canelas beach, Montalvo Beach, Major beach, Pragueira beach and, above all, La Lanzada Beach on the north shore.

Another point of attraction is the presence of the island of Ons, belonging to the municipality of Bueu and part of the National Park of the Atlantic Islands of Galicia, which can be reached by ferries from Sanxenxo, Portonovo, Marín and Bueu, with its superb beaches, as well as the privileged lookout towers on the ria, from O Grove to Home Cape.

The beach of La Lanzada is located at the entrance of the ria. It is an important tourist centre and a place with a legend about women who had to bathe in its waters to become pregnant.

The average annual temperature of its waters is 14 °C (57 °F), although in August it is about 18 °C (64 °F).

== Wildlife ==
The fauna of the ria de Pontevedra is very rich. Yellow-legged gulls abound and it is common to see herons, little egrets, sandpipers, etc. There are also many species of interest, including various species of shellfish (clams, praires, cockles, periwinkles, limpets, razor clams, mussels, oysters, scallops, queen scallops, velvet crabs), thanks to which some of the inhabitants of the ria work in the shellfish fishing sector.

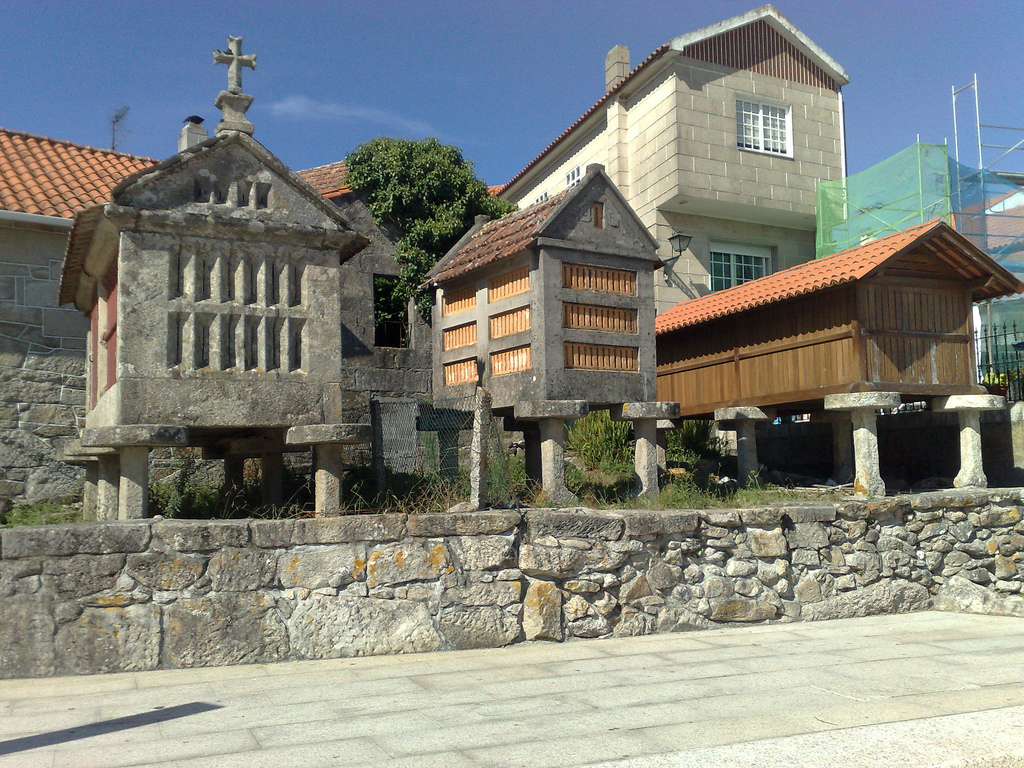
Hórreos, granaries on pillars by the sea in Combarro

== See also ==
=== Related articles ===
- La Lanzada Beach
- Montalvo Beach
- Areas Beach
- Silgar Beach
- Placeres Beach
- Paseo Marítimo de Pontevedra

=== External links ===
- Ria de Pontevedra on the website Galicia Tourism
- Ria de Pontevedra on the website Rias Baixas Tourism
- Description of the Ria de Pontevedra
