= Montalvo Beach =

Beach in Pontevedra, Spain

Montalvo beach
- Beach
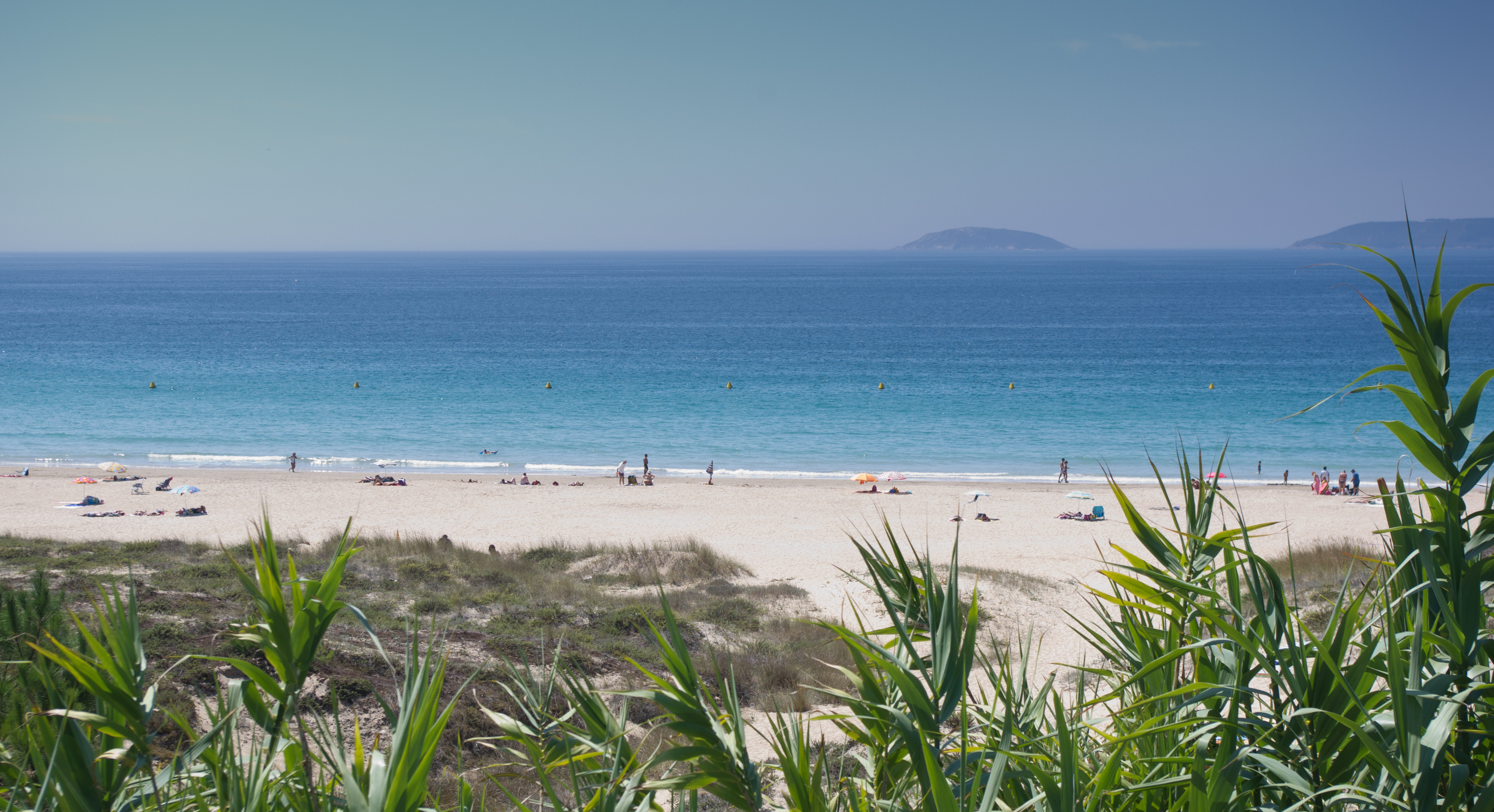
- Montalvo Beach with the Ons Island in the background

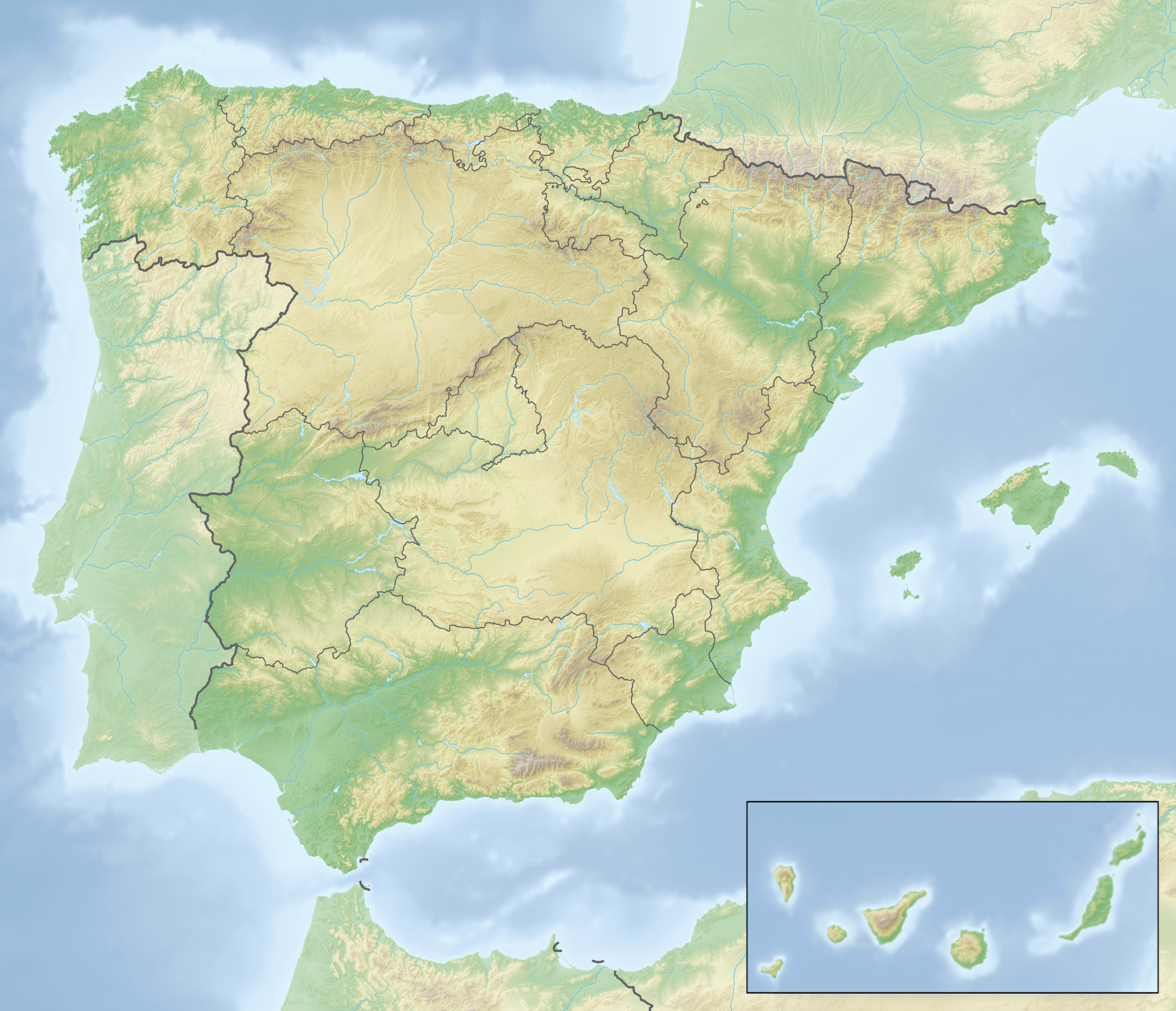
- Coordinates: 42°23′52″N 8°50′51″W
- Location: Sanxenxo

Dimensions
  - Length: 1,000 metres (3,300 ft)
  - Width: 80 metres (260 ft)

The Montalvo beach is a Galician beach located in the municipality of Sanxenxo in the province of Pontevedra, Spain. It is 1000 metres long and 80 metres width at low tide and 20 at high tide and has views over the Ria de Pontevedra.

== Description ==
It is a straight beach, located in a semi-rural environment. It is bordered on the left by Punta Montalvo, a natural promontory and scenic viewpoint, and on the right by Punta Paxariñas, which is less pronounced and separates Montalvo beach from Paxariñas beach.

The fine white sand forms very gently sloping dunes with sparse vegetation that separate the beach from the nearby pine forest. It is a wide, windy beach with moderate waves, which has an area for mooring boats.

== Access ==
From Sanxenxo, on the PO-308 road to O Grove, in Montalvo, take a left turn towards the beach.

== Gallery ==
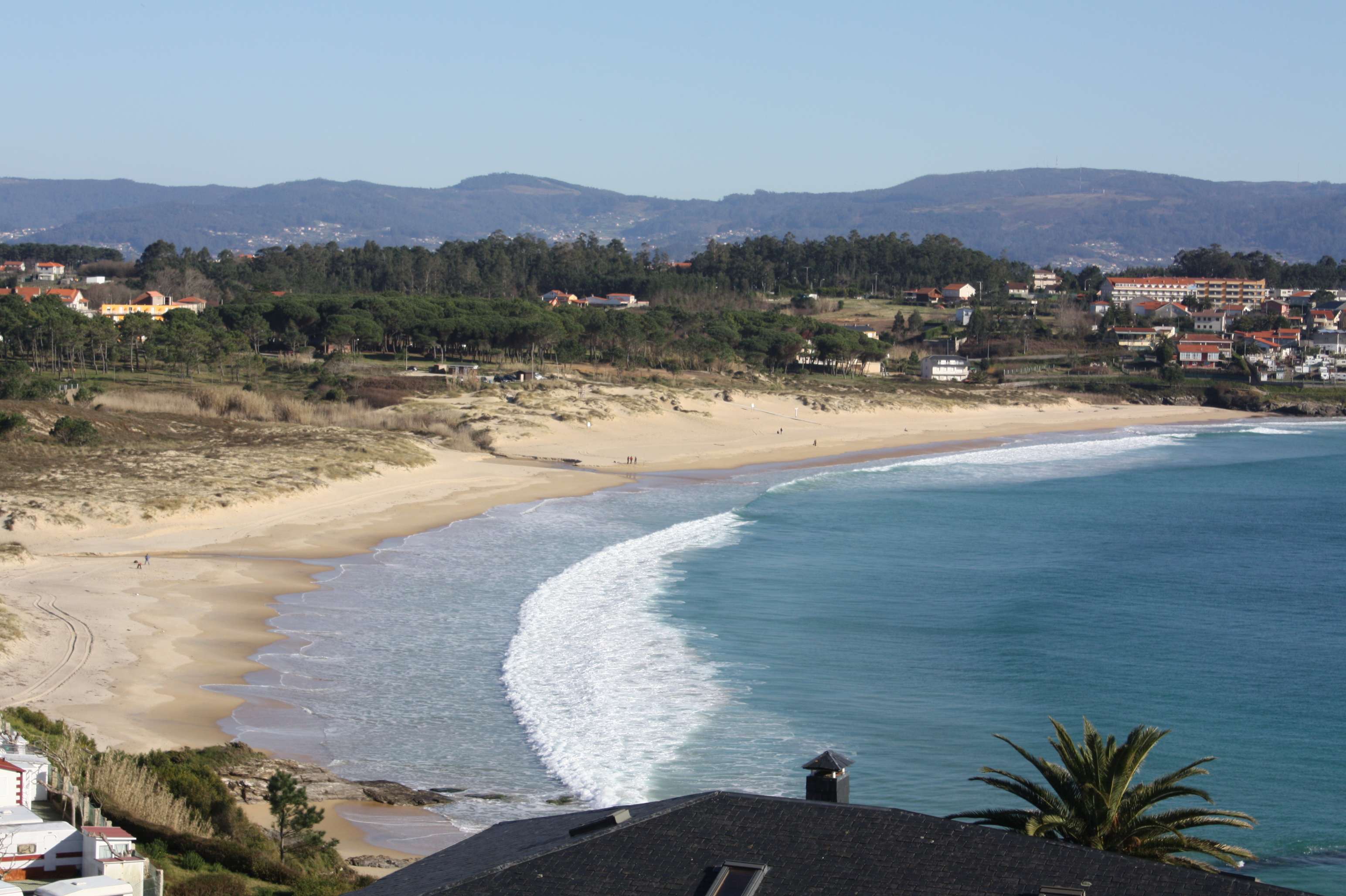

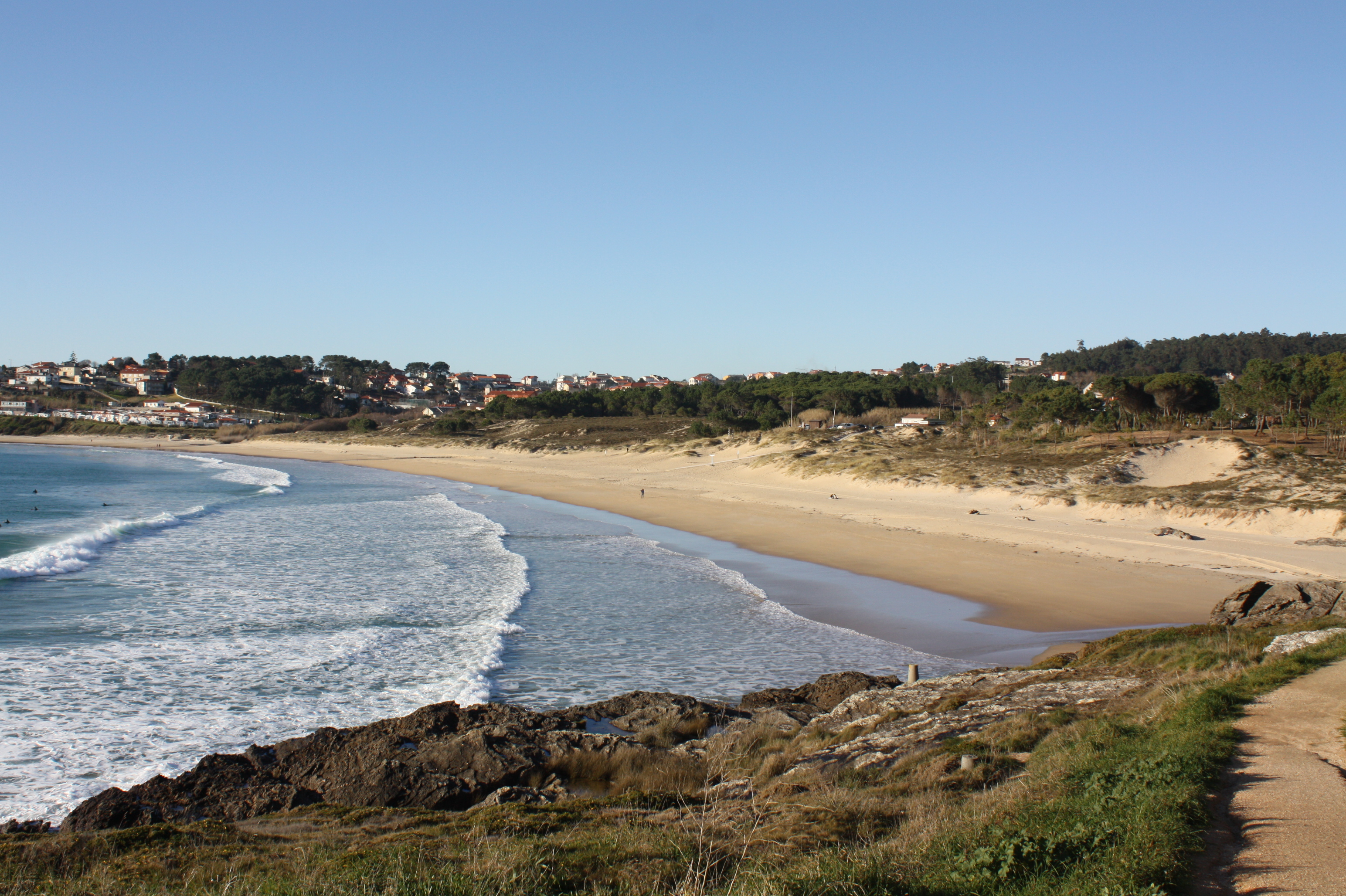

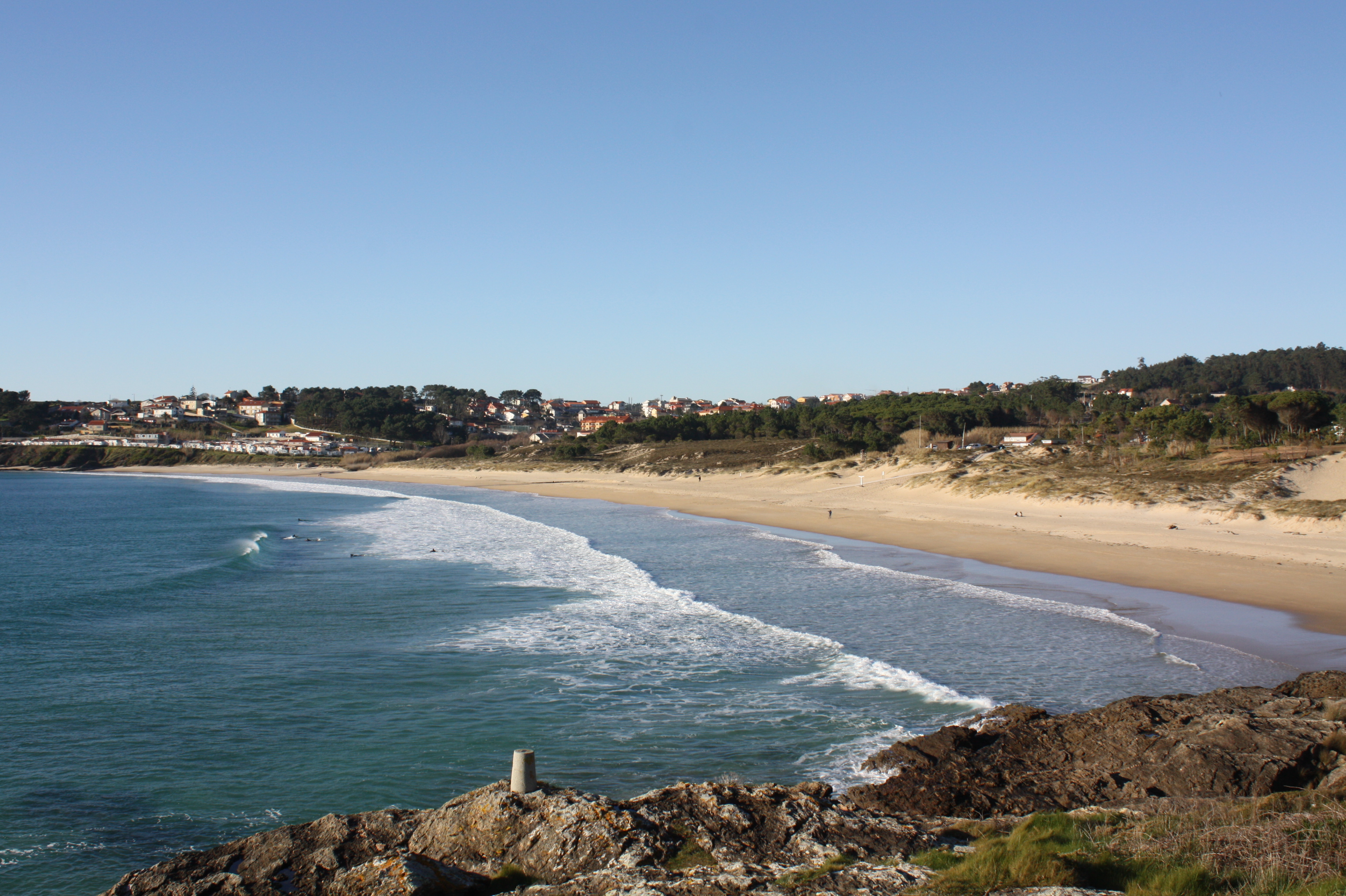

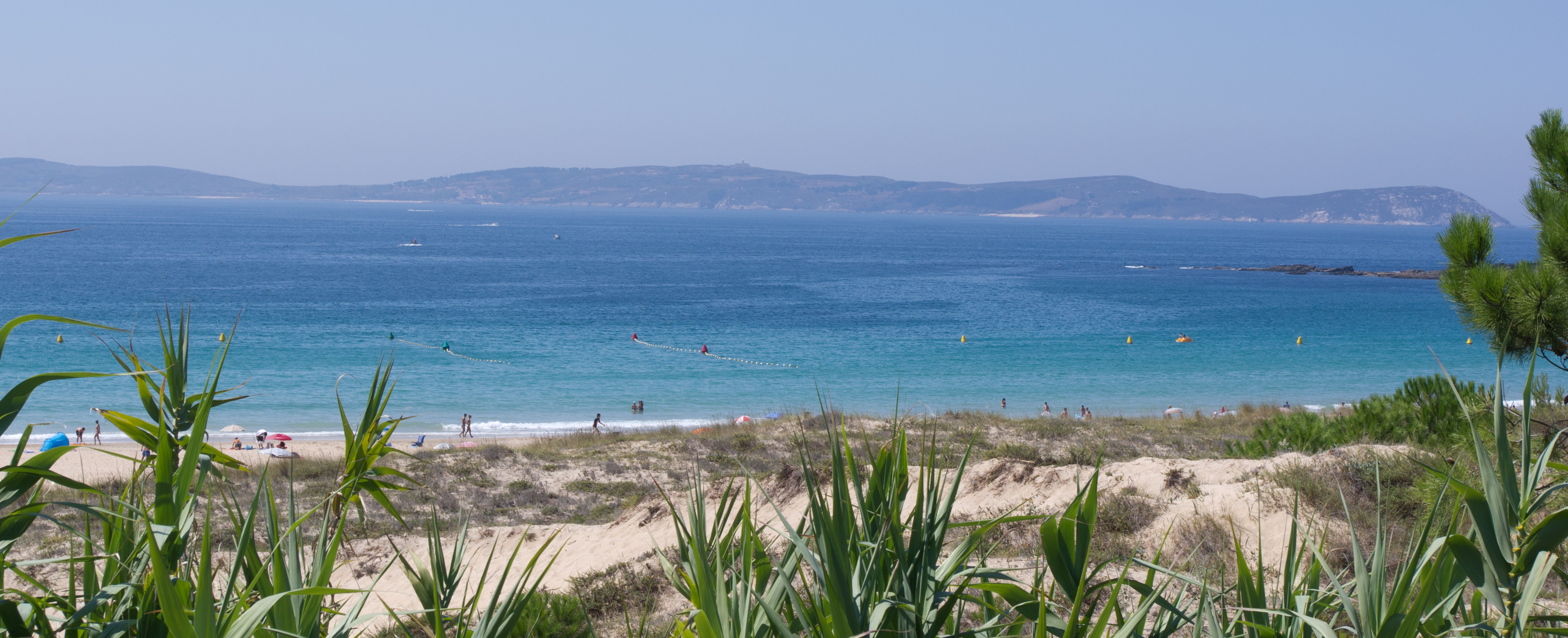

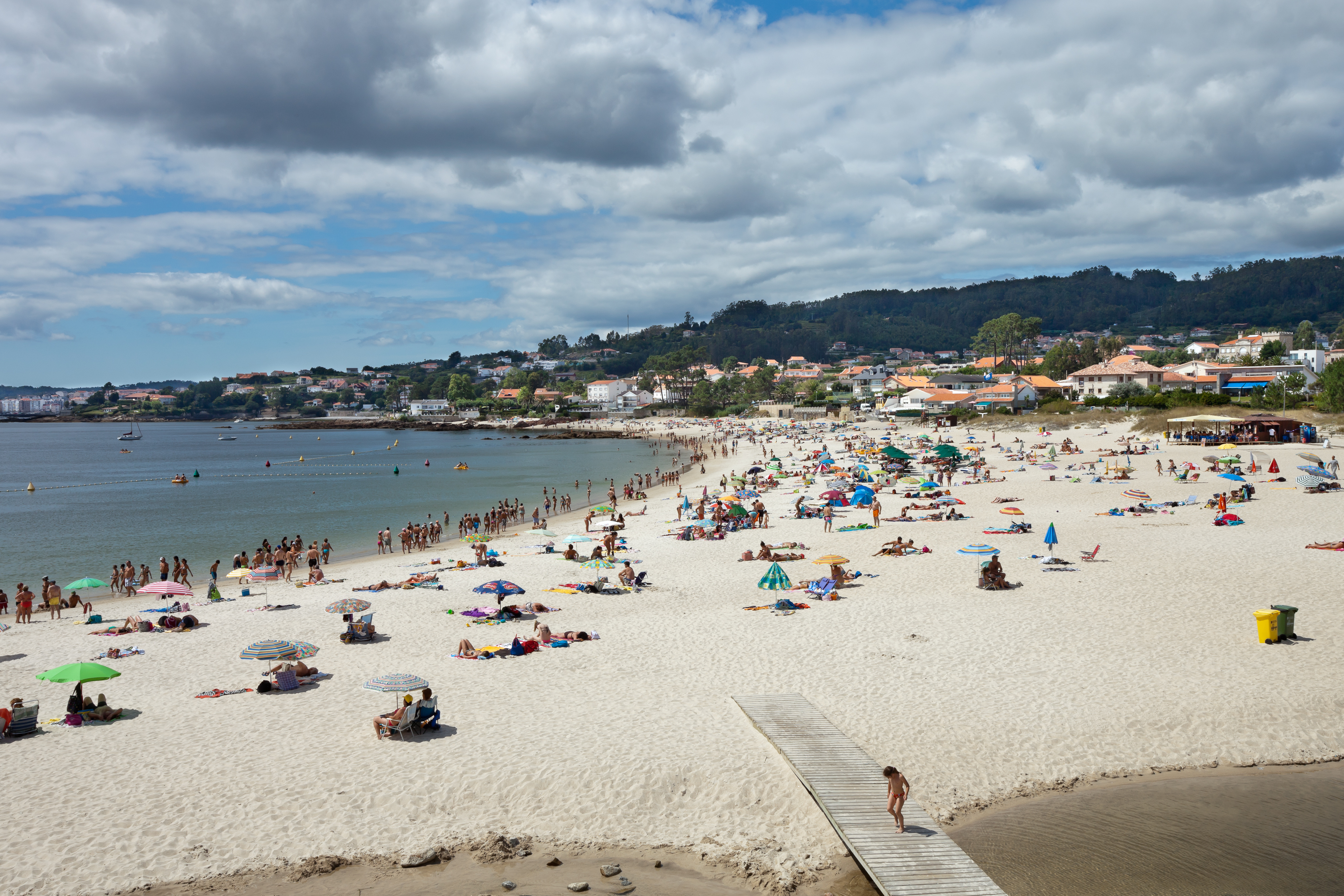

== See also ==
- Rías Baixas
- La Lanzada Beach
