= A Lanzada Beach =

Beach in Pontevedra, Spain

A Lanzada Beach Praia da Lanzada (Galician)
- Beach
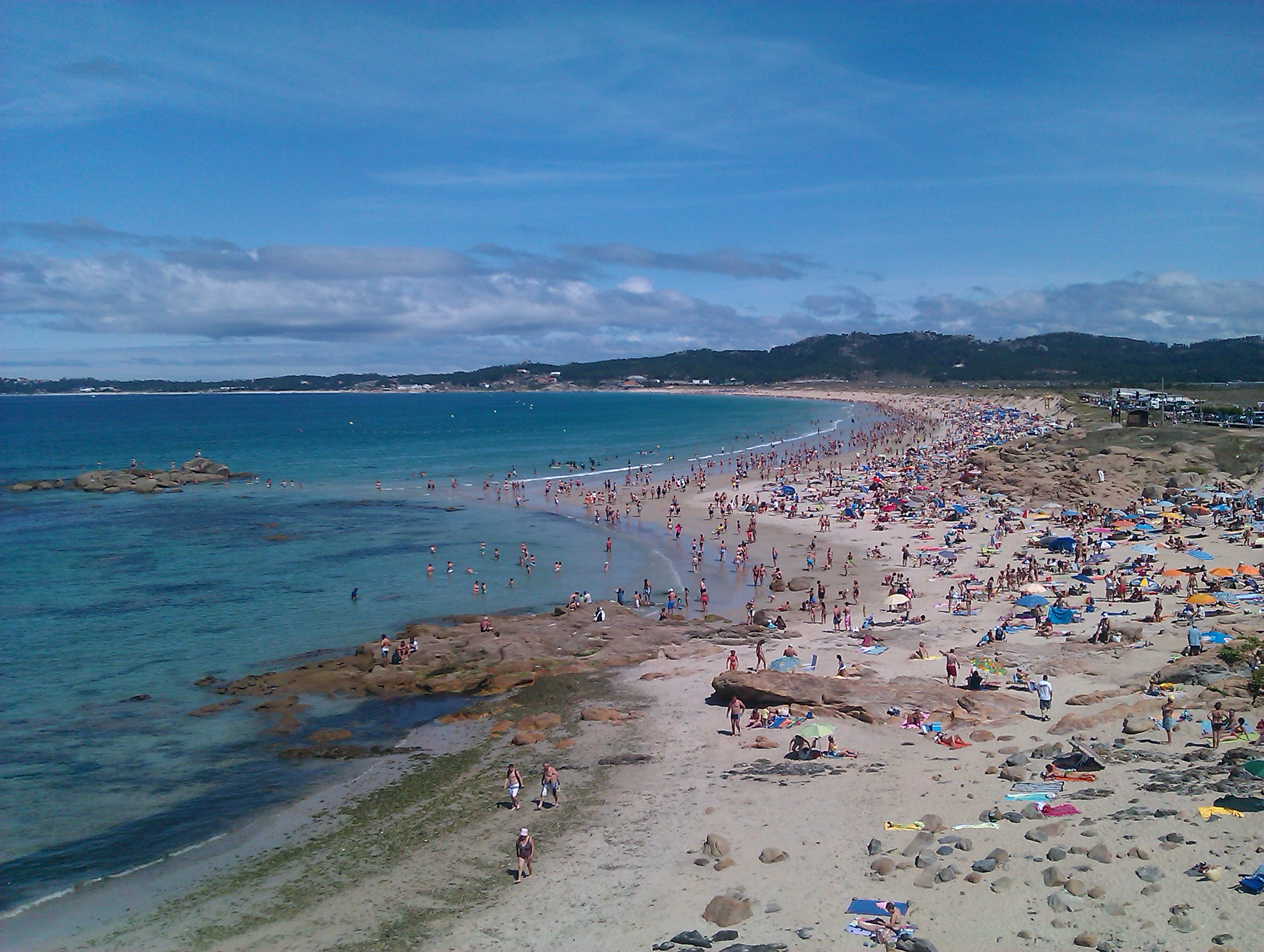
- A Lanzada Beach

- Coordinates: 42°27′00″N 8°37′59″W
- Location: Sanxenxo, O Grove

Dimensions
  - Length: 2,500 metres (8,200 ft)
  - Width: 80 metres (260 ft)

The A Lanzada beach (Galician: Praia da Lanzada) is one of the most famous beaches in Galicia (Spain). It is located in the municipalities of O Grove and Sanxenxo in the province of Pontevedra. The blue flag has been flying there for a long time.

== Description ==
It is located on the southwestern side of the isthmus that connects the O Grove peninsula to the mainland. It is located near the entrance to the ria of Pontevedra and the northern end of the isthmus borders the mouth of the ria of Arosa. Its northern end is close to the tourist village of San Vicente del Mar (O Grove).

The Lanzada is a very large beach: it is 2.5 kilometres long and more than three kilometres if the adjacent beaches of Areas Gordas and Lapa are included. It is the fourth longest beach in Galicia. Its different parts are given 3 names:

- Areas Gordas (Coarse sands)
- Lapa Beach (Limpet Beach)
- Lanzada Beach (Pier Beach)

It is one of the most famous and extensive beaches in Galicia. During the summer, many tourists come to visit it.

It is surrounded by a beautiful natural environment protected by dunes belonging to the Natura 2000 network. Currently, the dunes are a protected ecosystem.

== Activities ==
On this open sea beach, the sea is often rough, which is why sports such as surfing and windsurfing can be practiced. Kiteboarding is also practised here, as it is an open sea beach that can become very windy.

Places of interest such as the Lanzada Tower, the Castro of A Lanzada and the chapel of Our Lady of A Lanzada are only a few metres away.

== Access ==
From Pontevedra or Sanxenxo, it can be reached via the PO-308 road to O Grove.

The quickest way to get there is via the Salnés Motorway, AG-41, which is reached by taking the last exit towards O Grove.

== Gallery ==
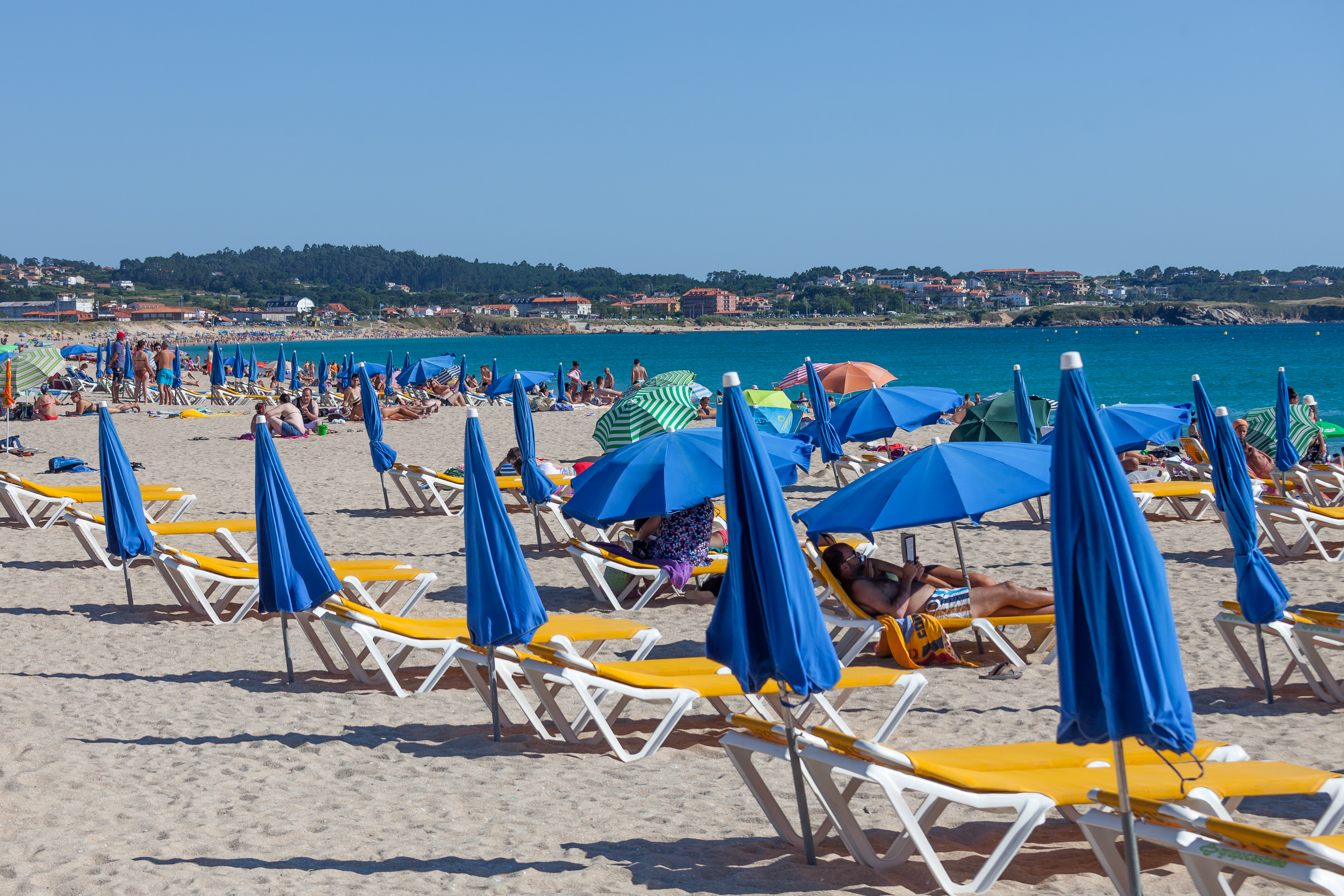

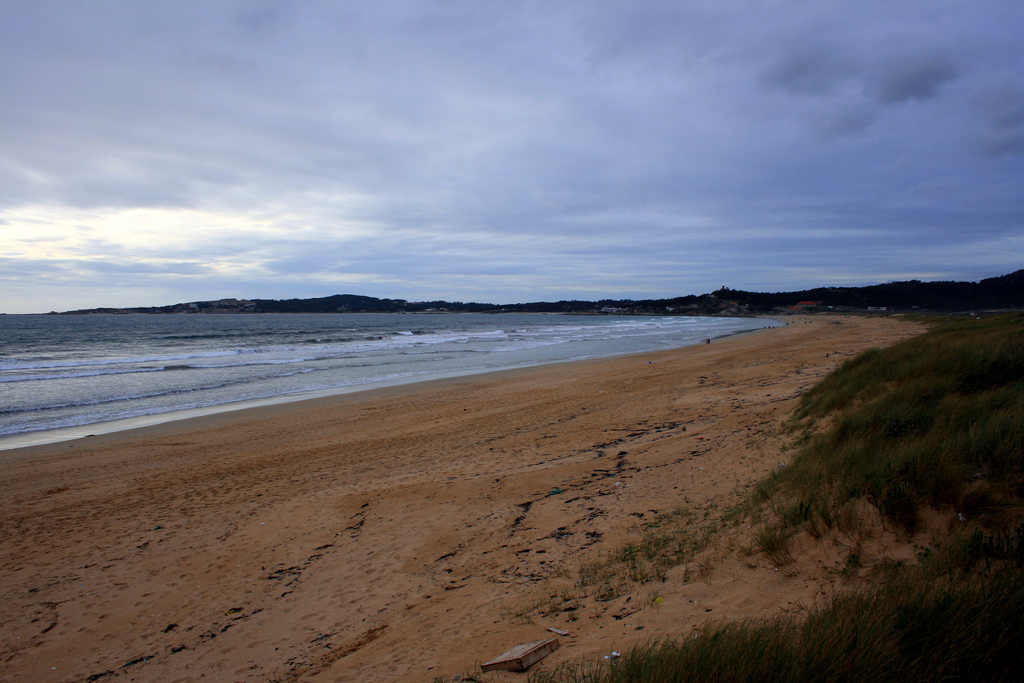

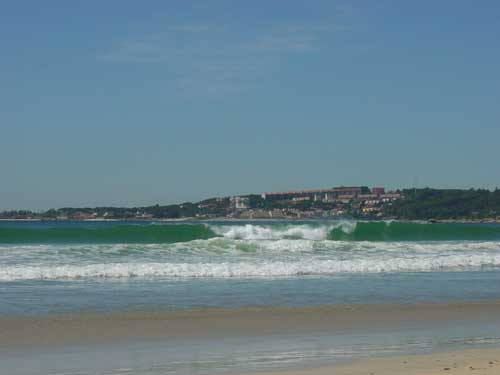
San Vicente de la Mer, in the background

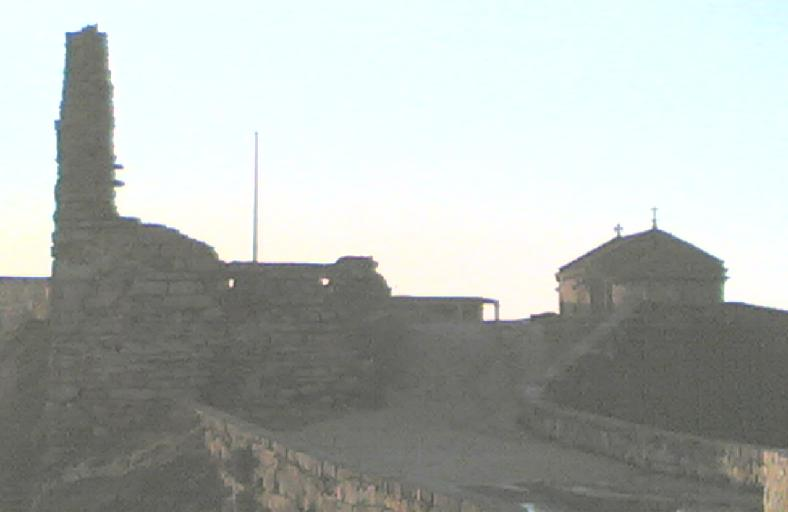
Tower and chapel

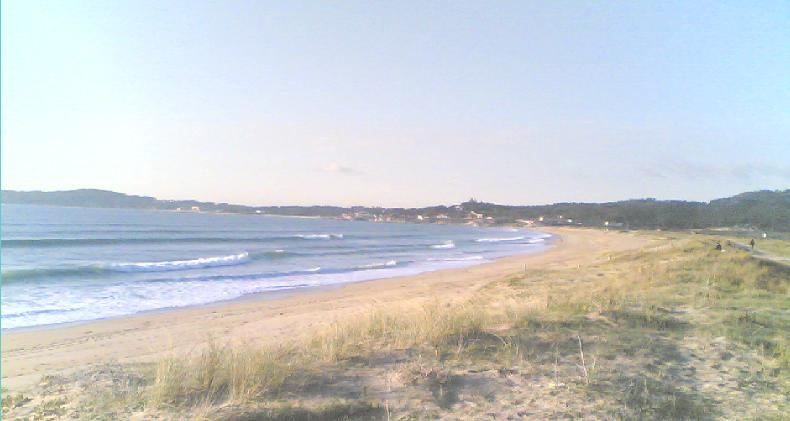
Empty beach

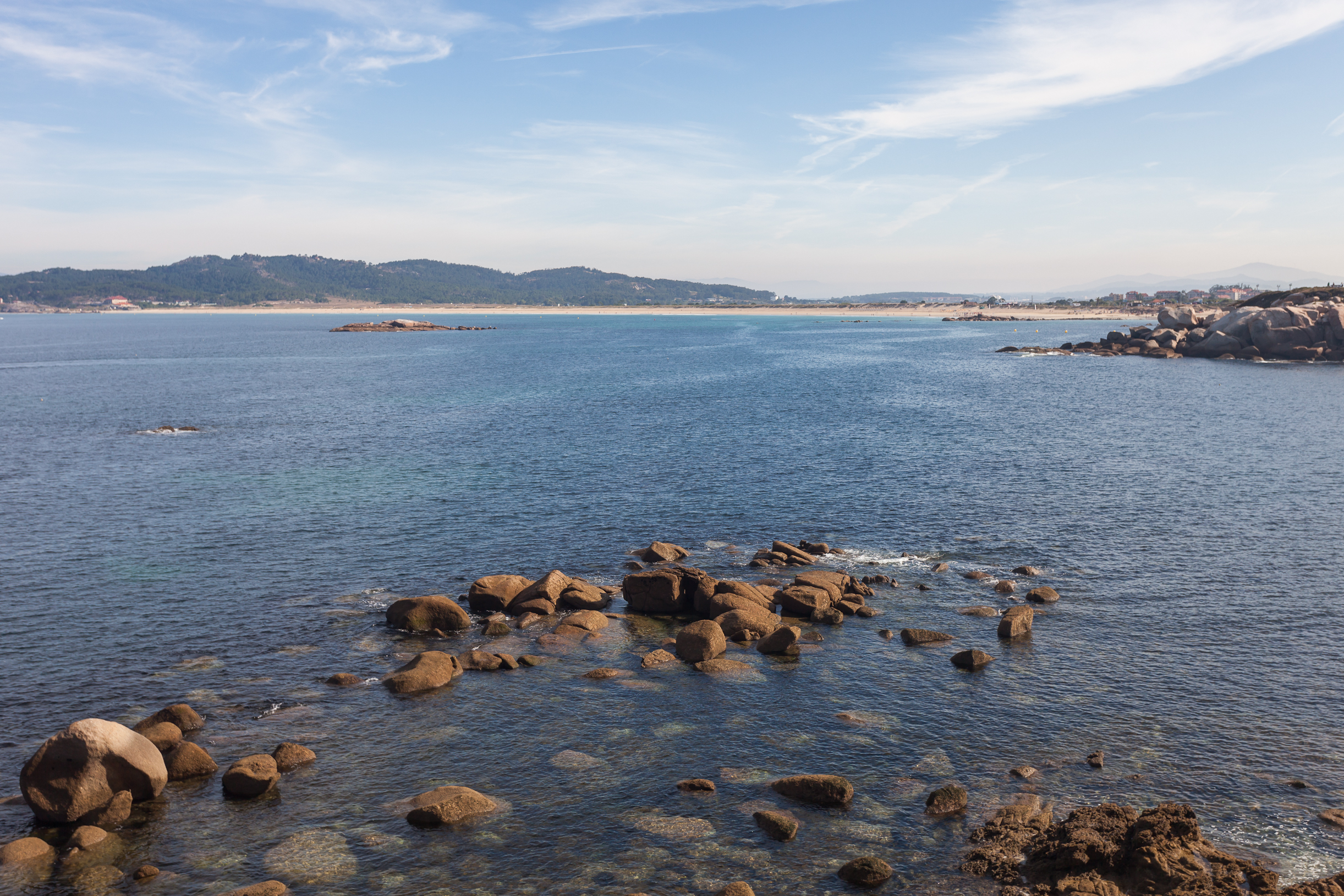

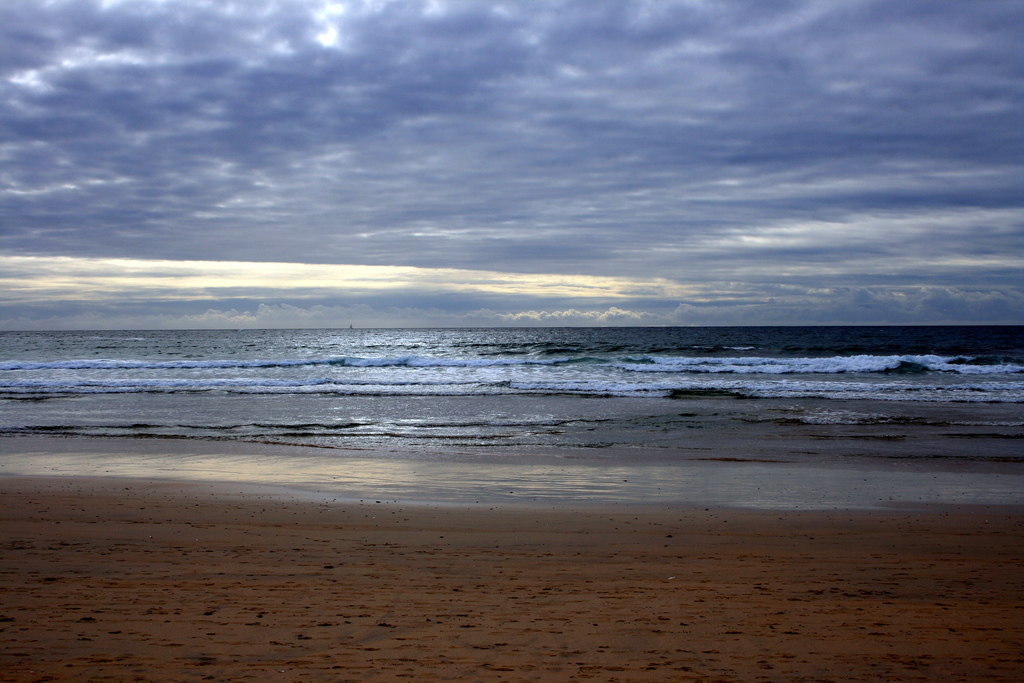

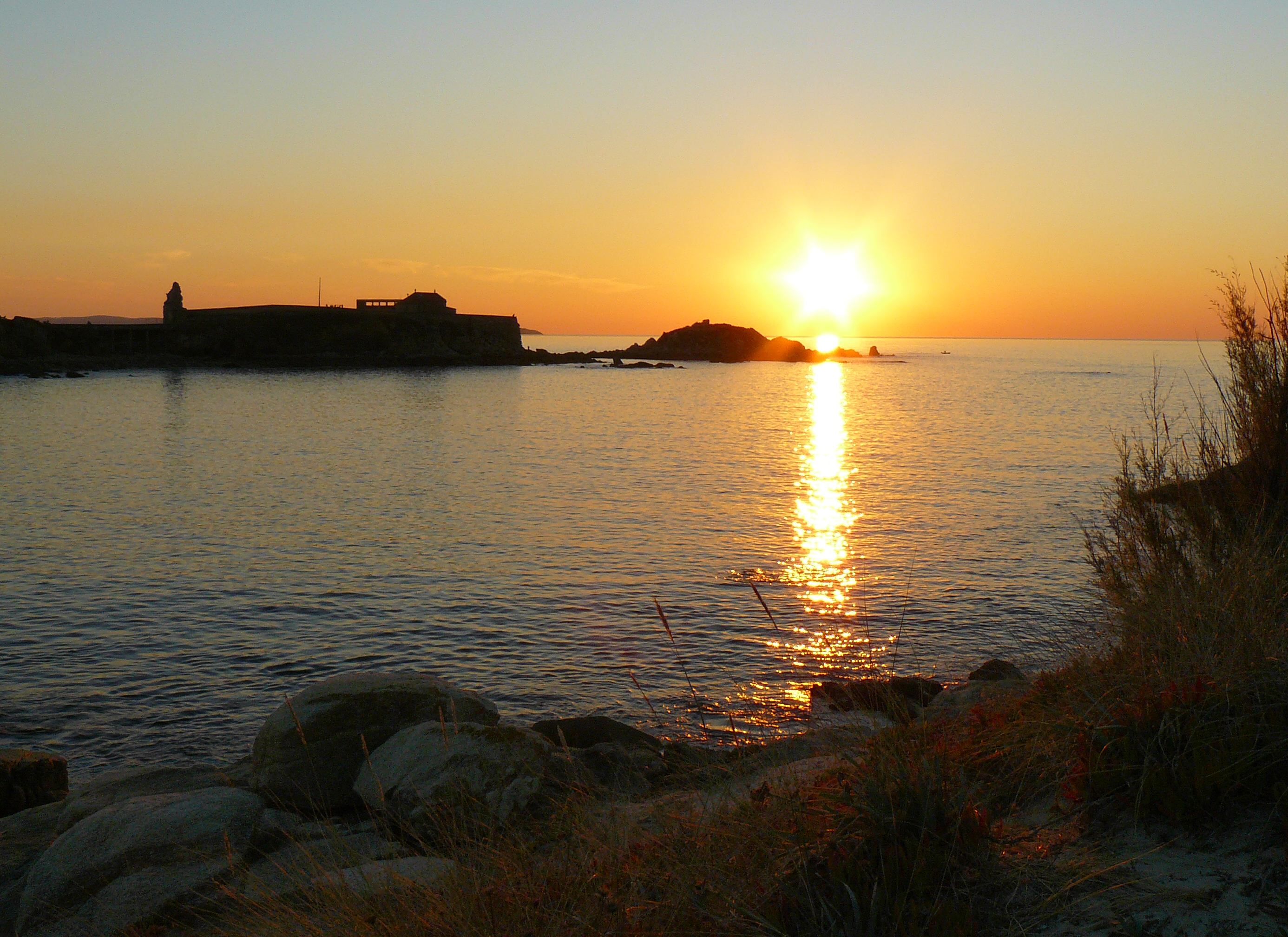
Beach and chapel in the background

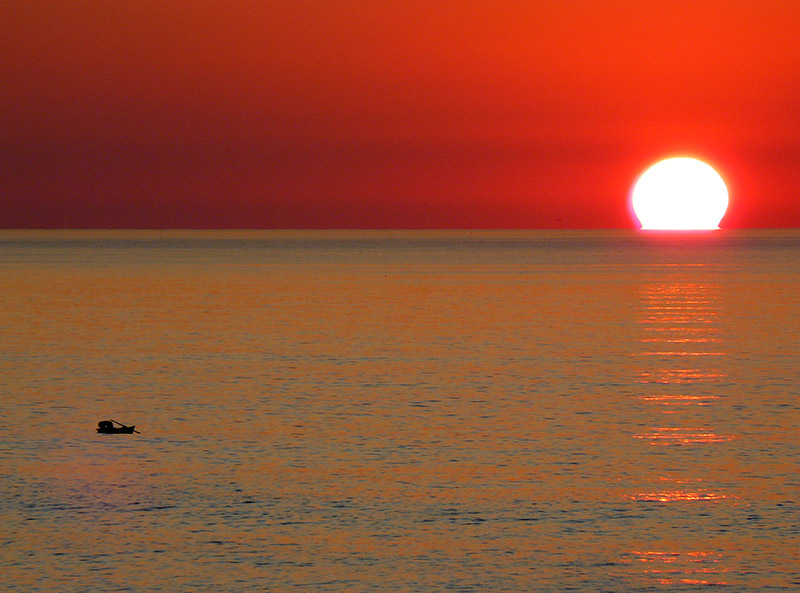

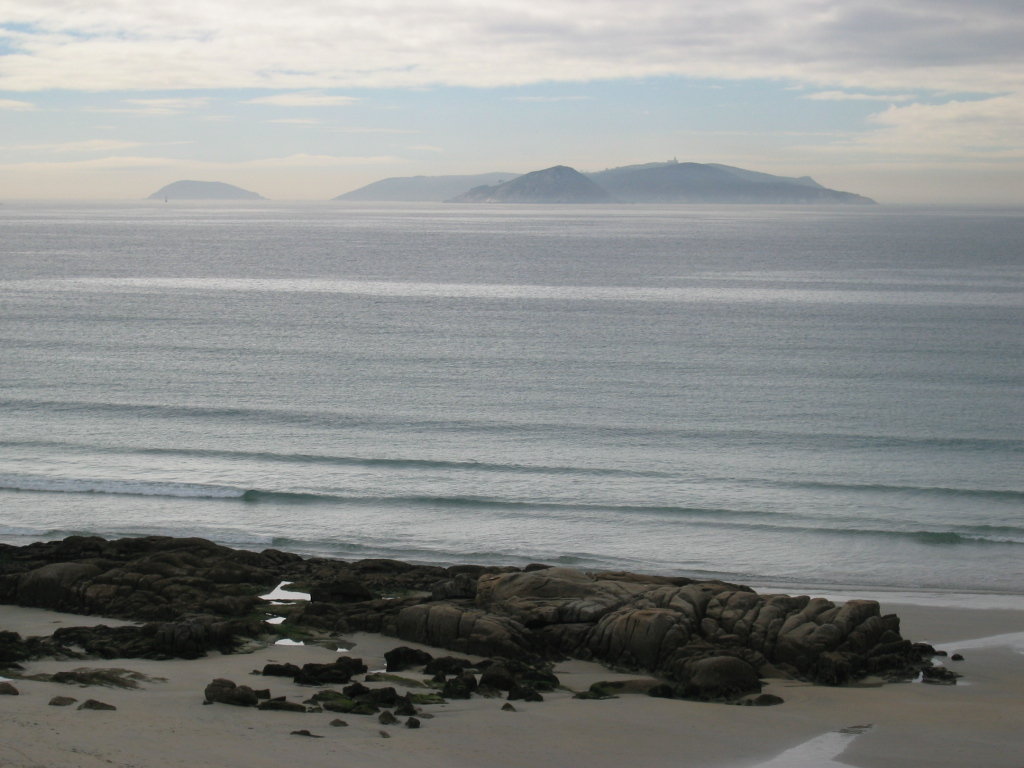
Ons Island from the Lanzada

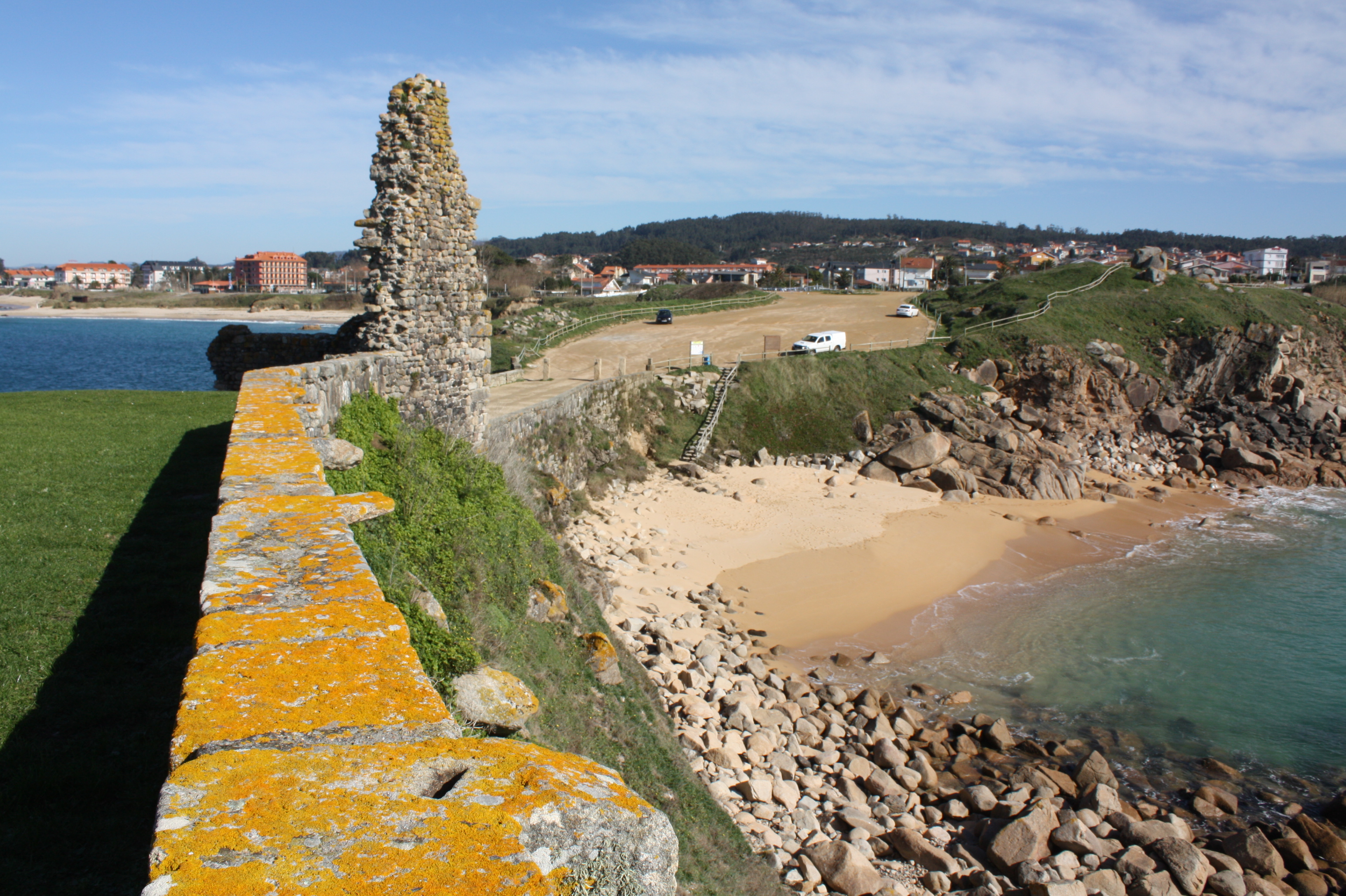

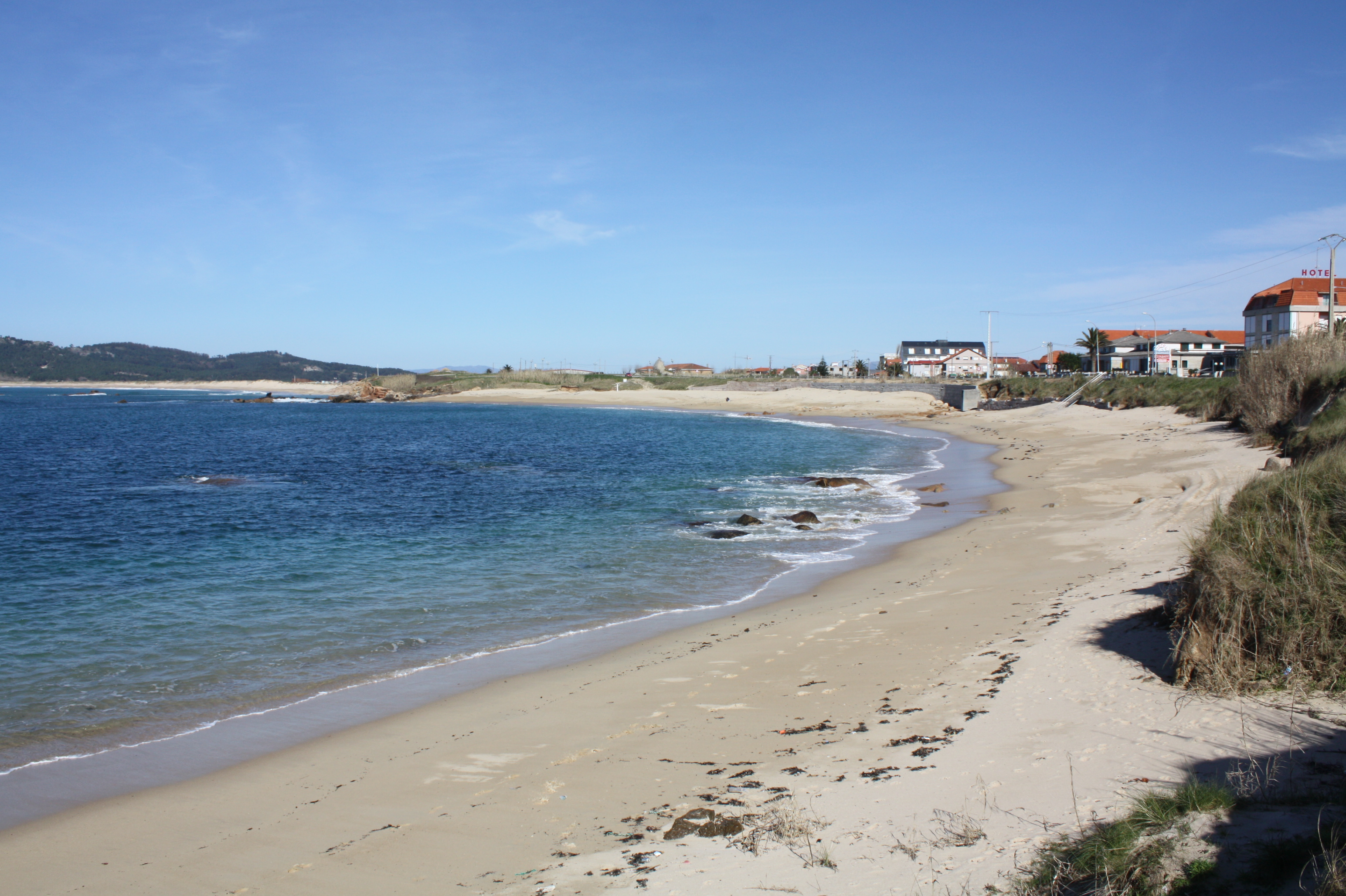
A Lapa Beach

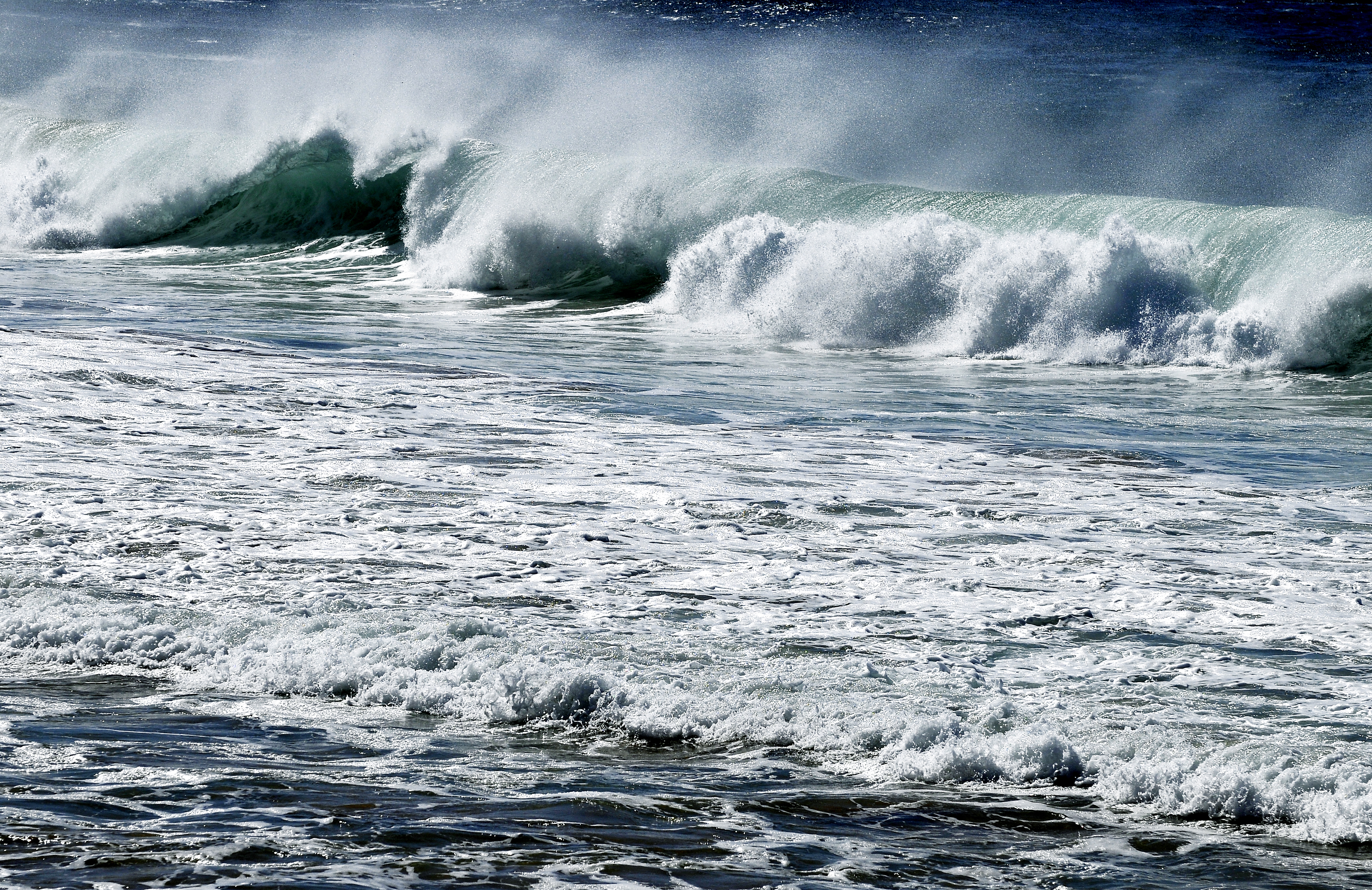

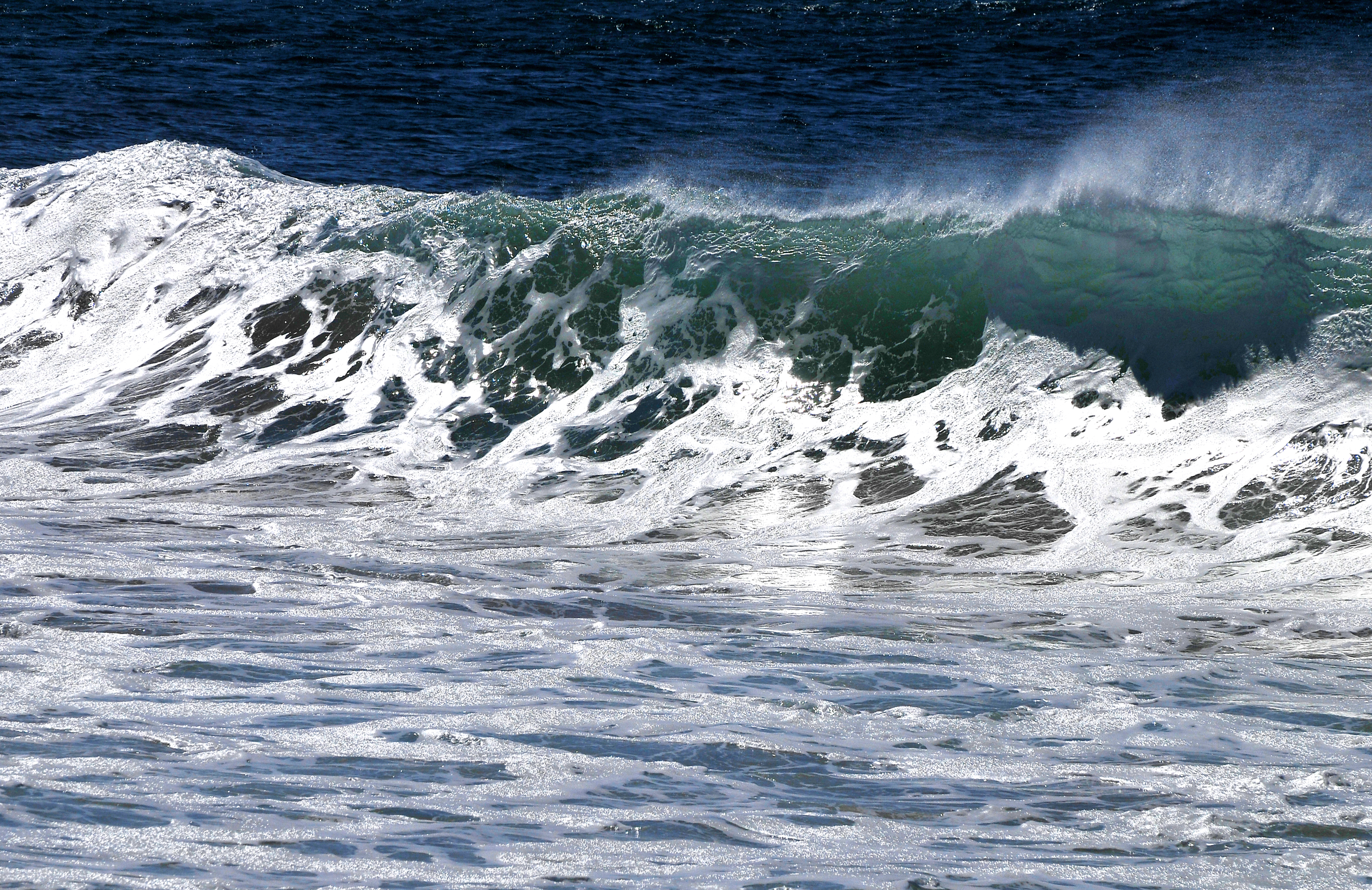

== See also ==
=== Related articles ===
- Ria de Pontevedra
- Province of Pontevedra
- Rías Baixas
- Montalvo Beach
- Sanxenxo
- O Grove
