= Areas Beach =

Beach in Pontevedra, Spain

- Beach
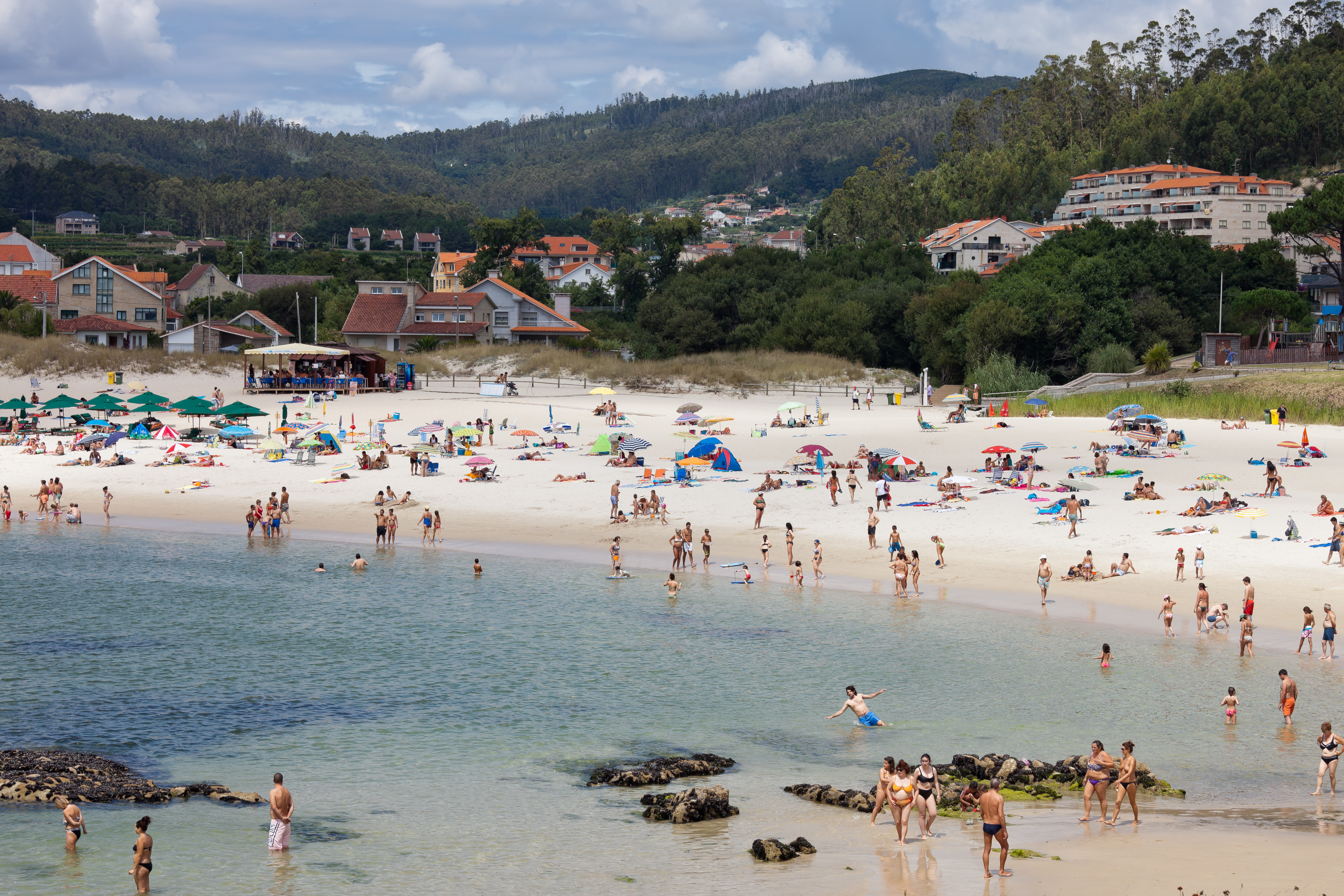
- Areas Beach

- Coordinates: 42°23′30″N 8°46′37″W
- Location: Sanxenxo

Dimensions
  - Length: 0.7 km (0.43 mi)
  - Width: 0.07 km (0.043 mi)

The Areas Beach is a Galician beach belonging to the municipality of Sanxenxo in the province of Pontevedra, Spain. It is 700 metres long and is located in the ria de Pontevedra, 15 km from Pontevedra.

== Description ==
It is an urban straight beach, semi-curved at one end. It is bordered at the eastern end by the small cove of the Deads, with access at low tide, and Punta Cabicastro, with beautiful views over the ria de Pontevedra. The sand is white and fine and it is sheltered from the wind, with calm waters suitable for water sports: water-skiing, sailing, jet-skiing, windsurfing (with a limit of 200 metres to the beach). There is a mooring area for boats.

At its eastern end is Punta Areas, which clearly demarcates the inner from the outer ria.

== Access ==
From Sanxenxo, the coastal road PO-308 towards Pontevedra is taken. In Areas, there is a turn-off to the right towards the beach.

== Gallery ==
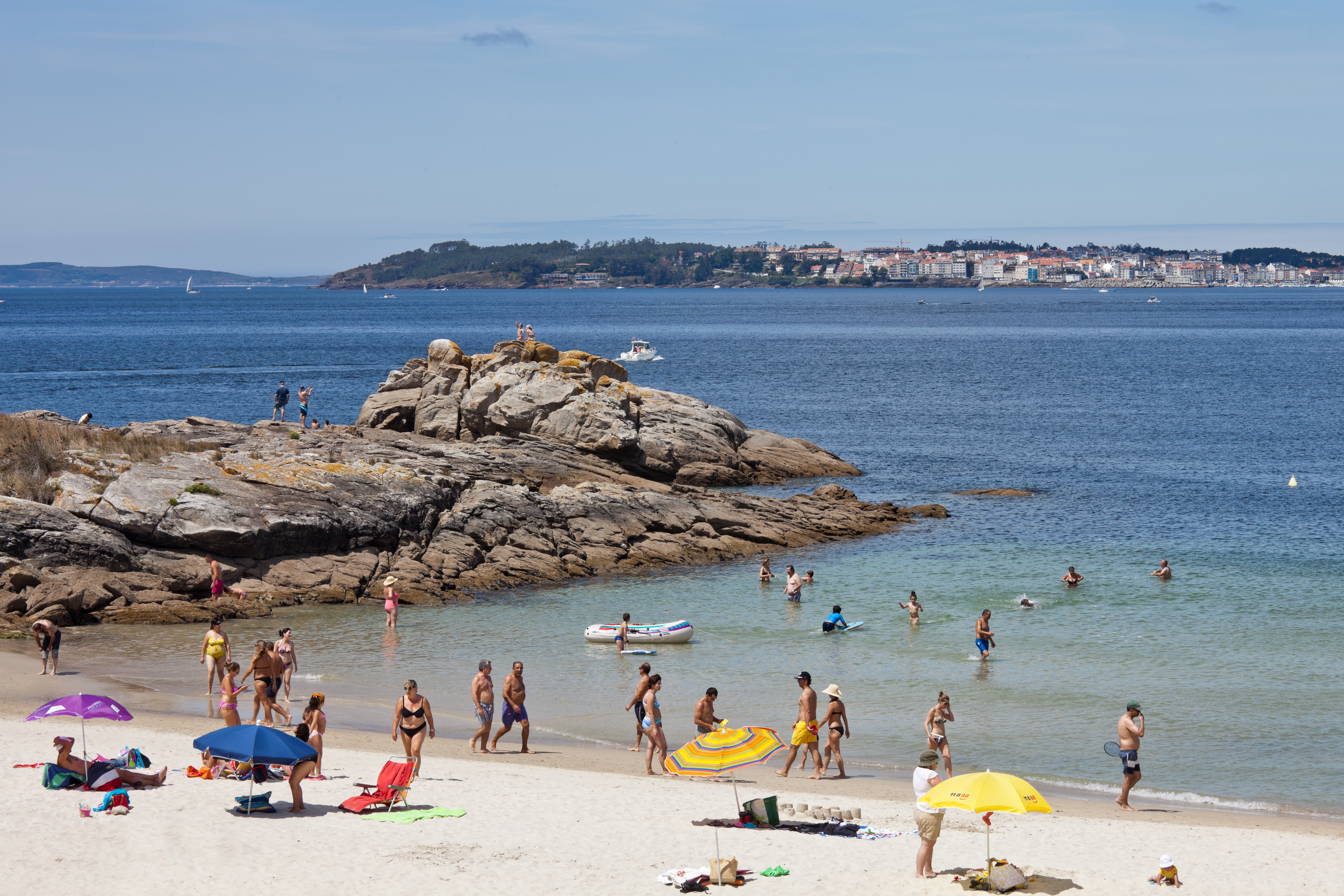

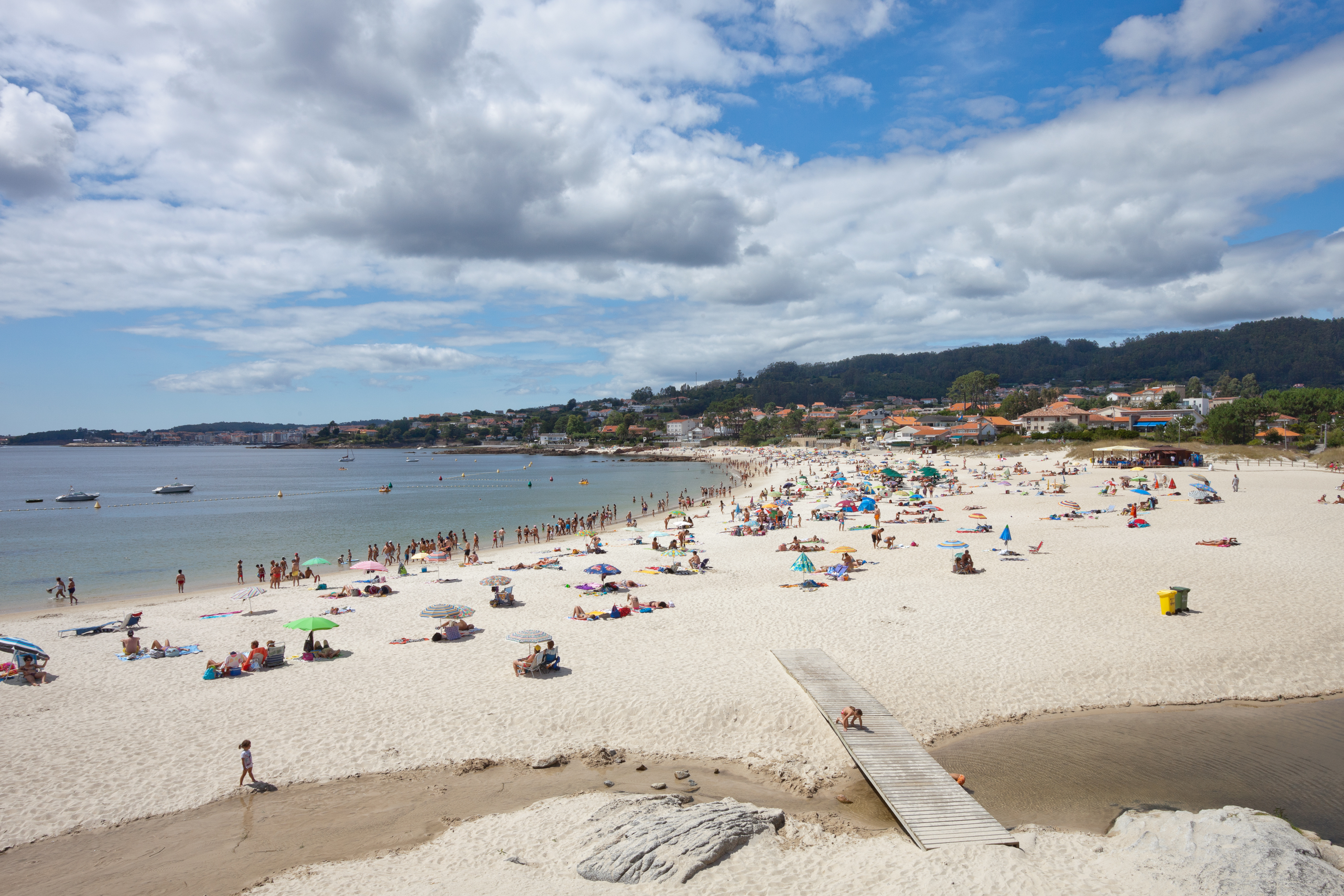

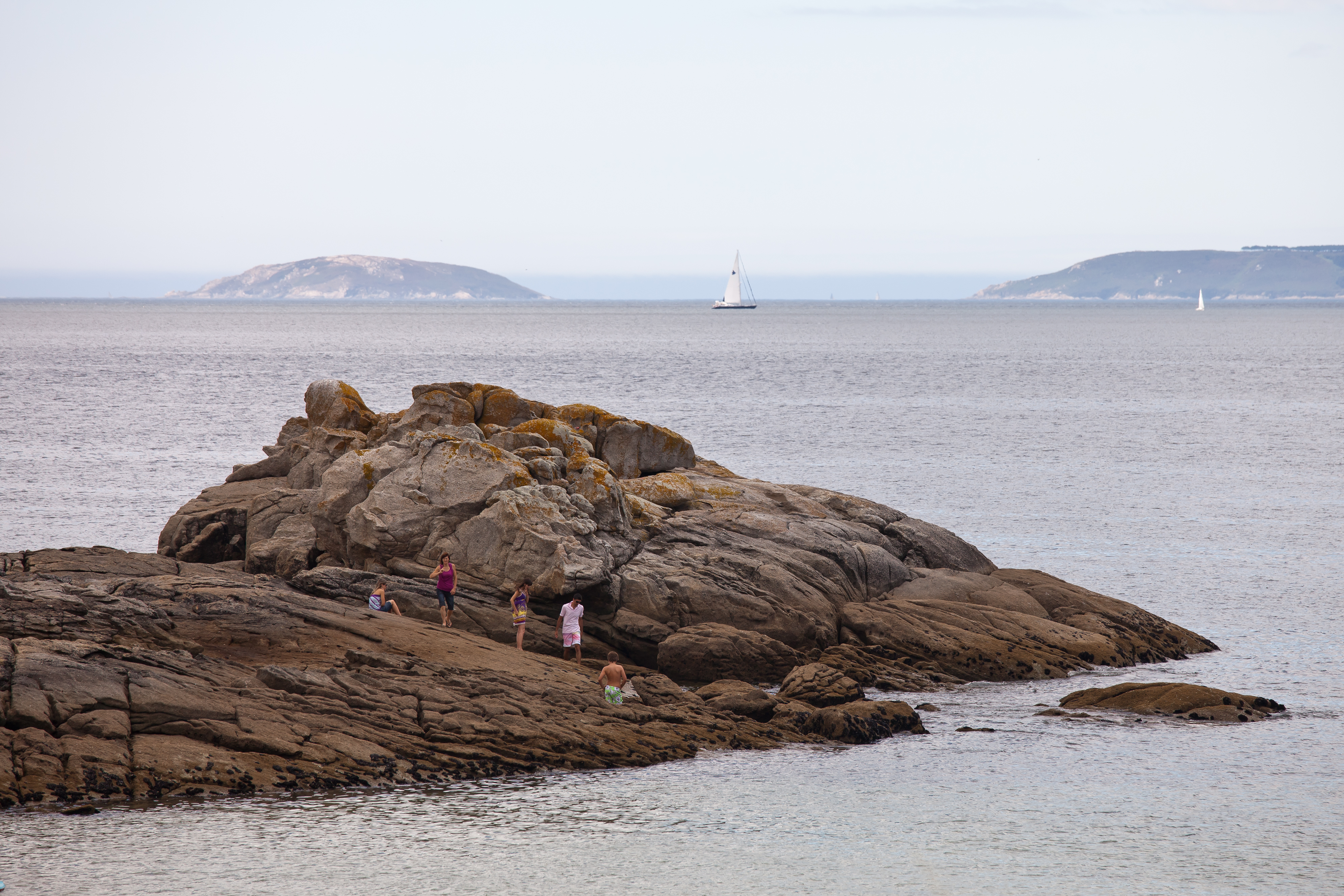

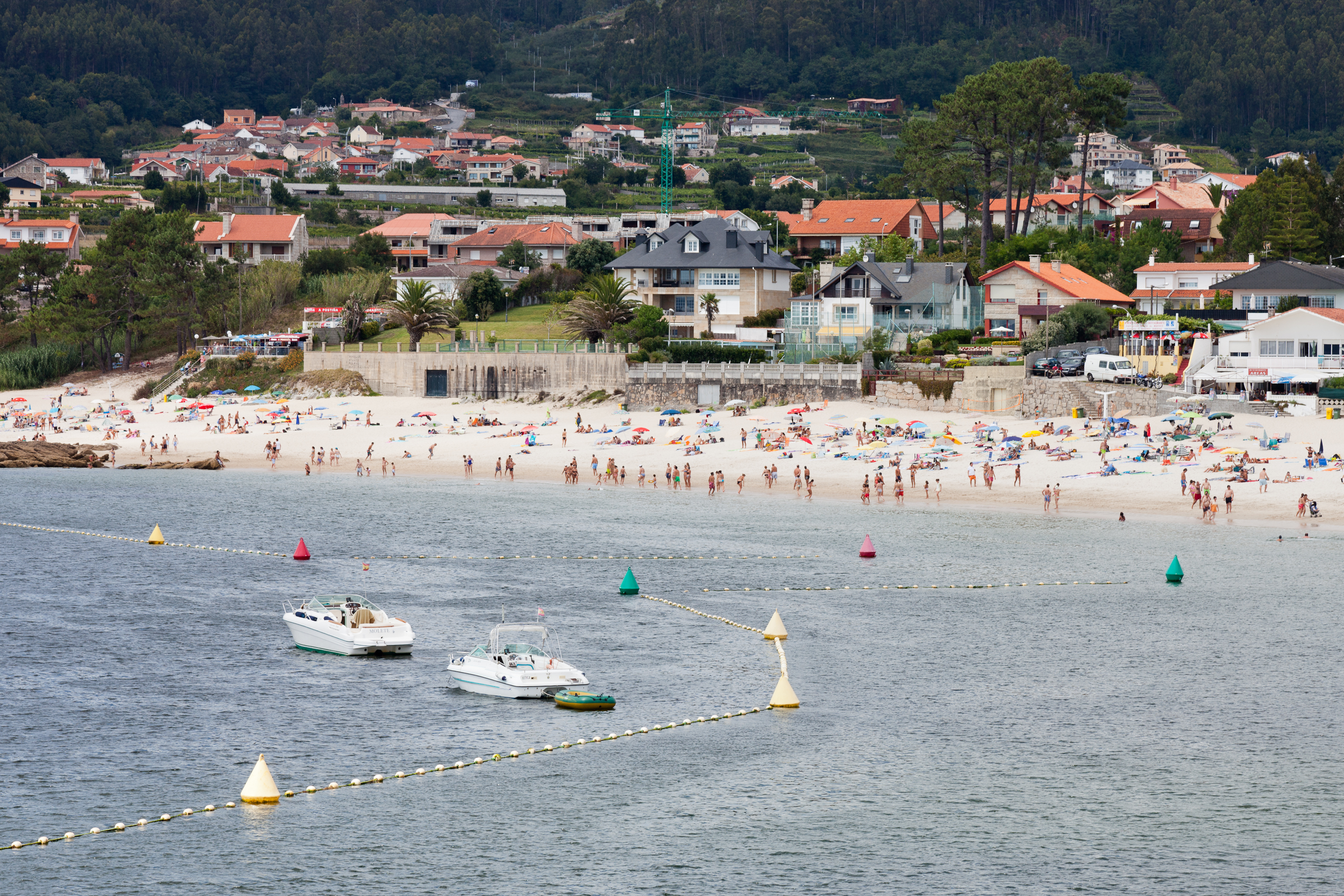

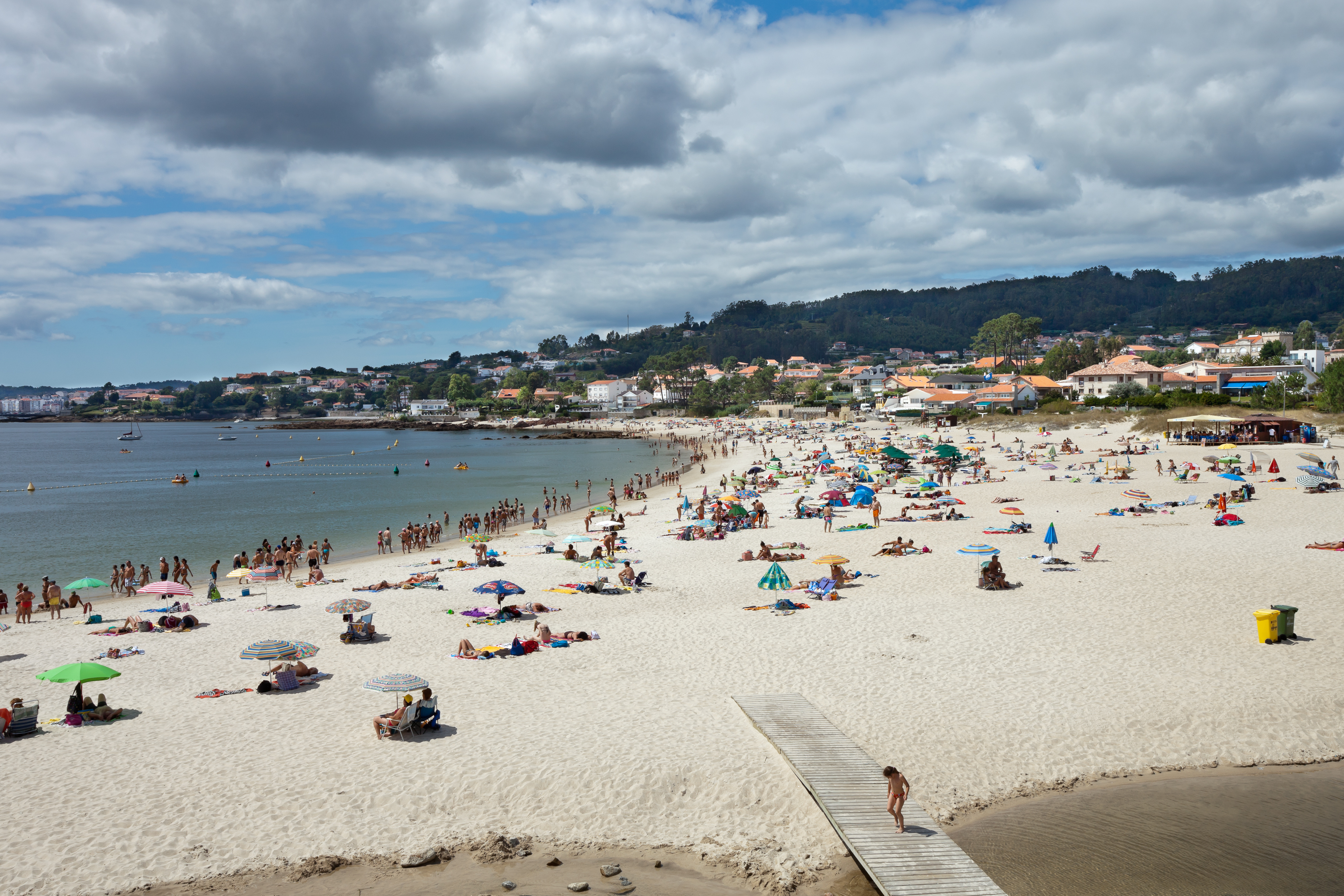
