= Sanxenxo =

Sanxenxo Sanxenxo (Galician) Sangenjo (Spanish)
- Municipality
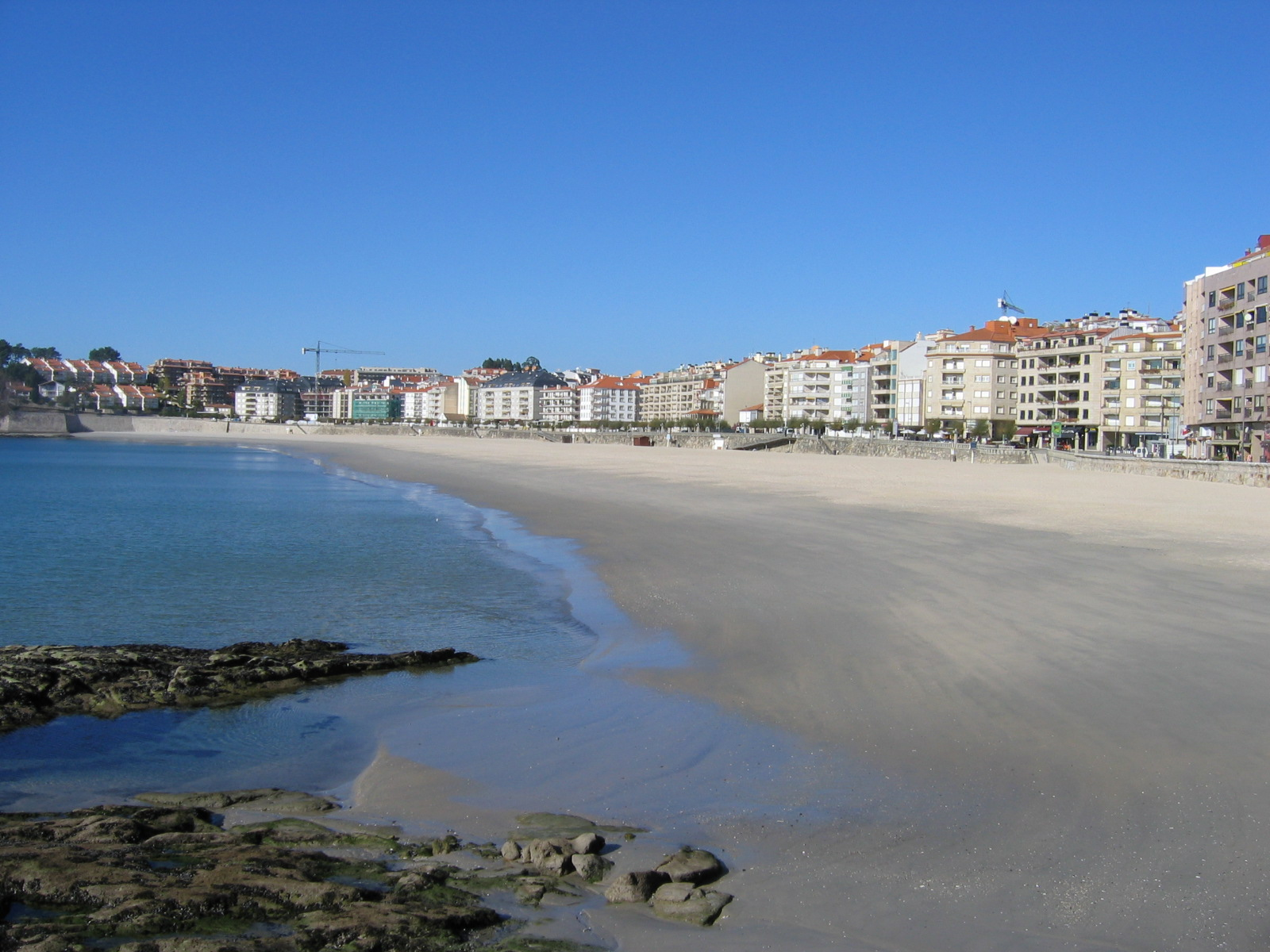
- Silgar Beach

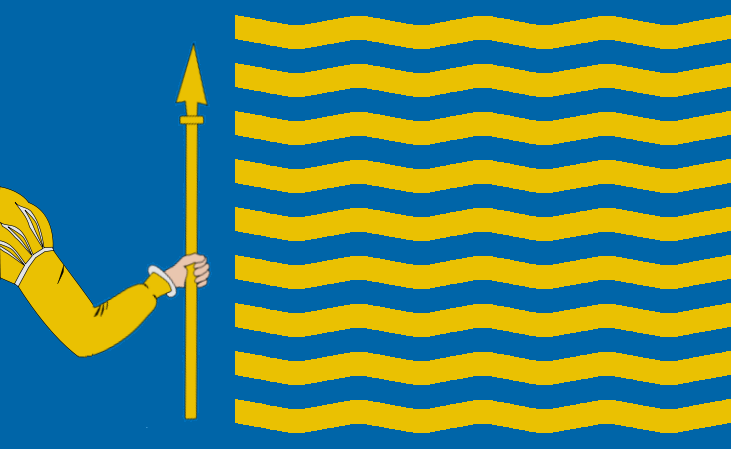
- Flag Coat of arms
- Interactive map of Sanxenxo
- Coordinates: 42°24.1′N 8°48.4′W
- Country: Spain
- Autonomous community: Galicia
- Province: Pontevedra
- Comarca: O Salnés
- Parishes: Adina, Bordóns, Dorrón, Nantes, Noalla, Padriñán, Vilalonga

Government
  - Type: Ayuntamiento
  - Body: Concello de Sanxenxo
  - Mayor: Catalina González Bea (PPdeG)

Area
  - Total: 44 km^{2} (17 sq mi)
- Elevation: 0 m (0 ft)

Population (2025-01-01)
  - Total: 17,990
  - Rank: 29th in Galicia
  - Density: 410/km^{2} (1,100/sq mi)
- Demonym(s): lilaino, lilaina
- Time zone: UTC+1 (CET)
  - Summer (DST): UTC+2 (CEST)
- Postal code: 36960
- 36051: INE code
- Website: Official website

Sanxenxo (Galician: [sanˈʃɛnʃʊ]; Spanish: Sangenjo) is a municipality in Galicia, Spain, in the province of Pontevedra.

It is situated in the southern part of the O Salnés region 15 kilometres west of the city of Pontevedra and is bordered by the Atlantic Ocean, and the estuaries of Pontevedra and Arousa. The municipality has a population of 17,347 inhabitants (INE 2019).

A popular tourism destination, Sanxenxo is a favorite resort for Spanish public figures such as Mariano Rajoy (former Prime Minister of Spain) and Amancio Ortega (co-founder of the Inditex group).

The Volvo Ocean Race was held in the town in 2005–2006. The race organisation and the competing teams chose Sanxenxo as their base in Spain. An In Port race took place in Sanxenxo on November 5. It gave spectators a chance to see the race boats at close quarters.

The 2013 edition of the Tour of Spain was held in the Rías Baixas, Galicia, between August 24 to September 14. Sanxenxo was the goal in the first stage of La Vuelta 2013 that began in Vilanova de Arousa in a Batea, a wooden platform out in the water used for farming of mussels, oysters and scallops.

== Location ==
The municipality borders the other municipalities of O Grove and Meaño in the region of O Salnés and Poio, in the province of Pontevedra.

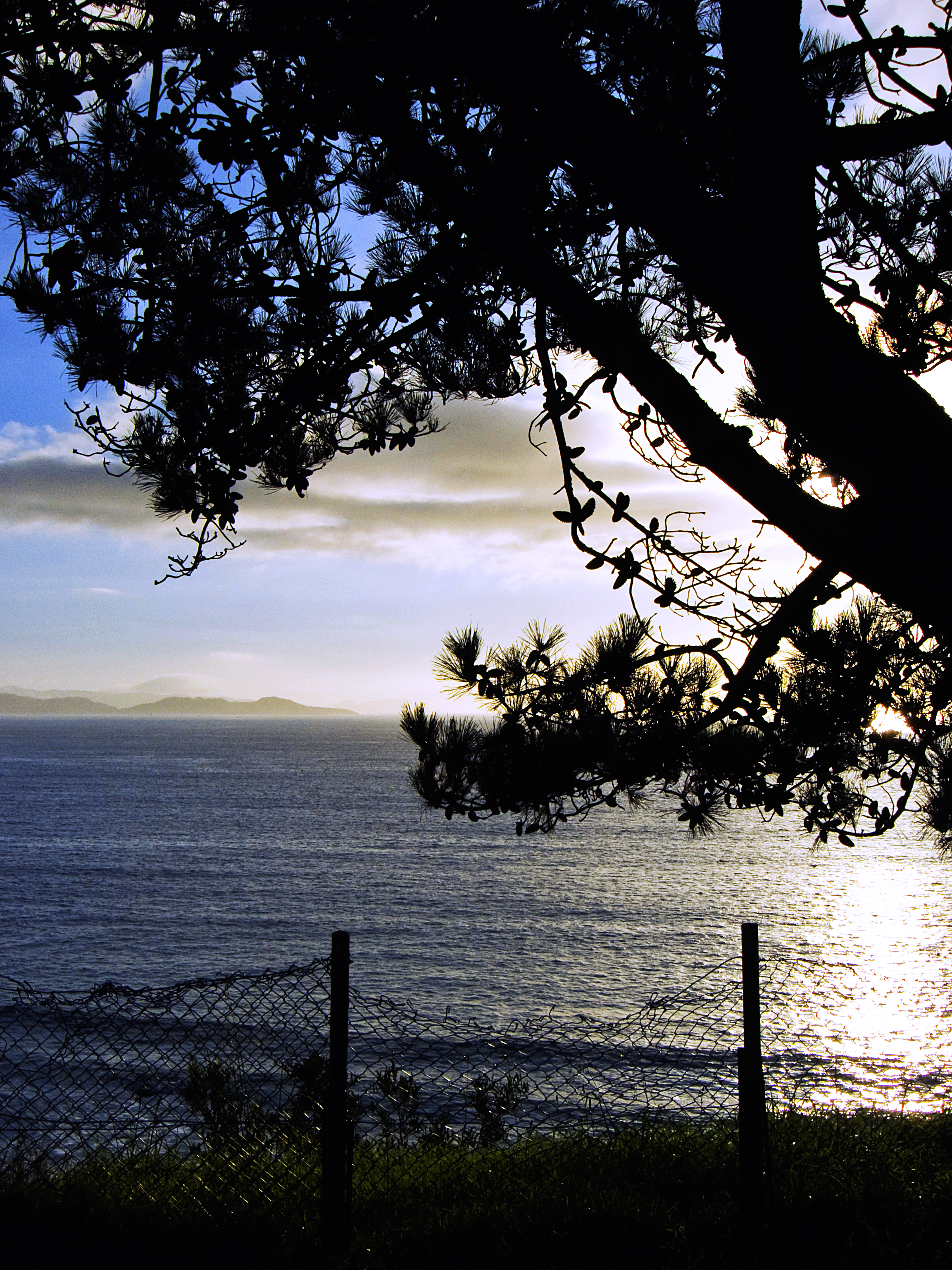
View of Palacios, Sanxenxo

== Etymology ==
In Galician, San Xenxo means Saint Genesius, patron saint of the town (along with Saint Rosalia). The exonym in Castilian (or rather the Castilianization of the name), Sangenjo or sometimes Sanjenjo, is considered controversial by the Galician people and was dismissed as an official place name officer by the Board of Galicia under the Law of Linguistic Normalization of June 15, 1983, so since then the sole official toponym is Sanxenxo.

== Beaches ==
- A Lanzada: gravel beach for surfers which faces the open sea and has good surf all year round because it is not protected by the island of Ons as are the others. Sanxenxo shares this beach with the town of O Grove.
- Silgar: Silgar fills every summer with Spanish and foreign tourists. The Madame is a statue that is in a rock that lies midway between the shore and the buoy and that is emblematic of Sanxenxo.
- Baltar: Also known as Portonovo beach, separated from the beach at the tip of Sigar Vicano is a beach with a large green area behind, pursued its course in two walks, one of wood, and small and unusual dunes near the village. This, together with Canelas and Caneliñas conform Portonovo beaches.
- Caneliñas: small beach of fine white sand. It is usual to see young people enjoying the Covas, a strait of water between two rocks on one edge of the beach and is completely empty when the low tide.
- Canelas: Caneliñas and after leaving the tip of Seam, we consider this beach dunes and small size, place of young people in the summer Portonovo.
- Paxariñas: hidden and nestled among the rocks this small beach is accessible by a drop enabled by the council.
- Montalvo: giving to the island of Ons and back to a notorious forest, the beach is between two separate campsites.
- Areas: a beach which usually come from tourism and the nearby municipalities of Pontevedra and Poio.
- Bascuas: small and quiet nude beach, the only such Sanxenxo around. Little or nothing visible from the main road Bascuas takes refuge from the wind through the rocks surrounding it.
- Lapa: situated in the parish of Noalla between Area Gorda beach, separated only by the island's physician, and A Lanzada, presents a half-shell.
- A Nosa Señora: small cove situated at the foot of the shrine of A Lanzada, between beaches and Foxos Area Gorda. Presents an area of fine white sand and sand with fatter where the rocks are frequent and large boulders.
- Areas Gordas: Semi beach noted for the quality of its waters and its white and fine sand.
- Panadeira: small and not very deep sea has been at the center of the coastline of the village. Attached to a playground, is heavily used by local people.
- Lavapanos: Small beach, situated in the centre of Sanxenxo.
- Other blue flag beaches are: Maxor, Nanín, Pragueira, or Foxos Santa Mariña; as well as other small Carabuxeira, Praia dos Barcos, Agra, A Granxa, and Fontela.

== Notable people ==
- Juan Norat (1944–2021), footballer
- Fran Rico (born 1987), footballer

== Gallery ==
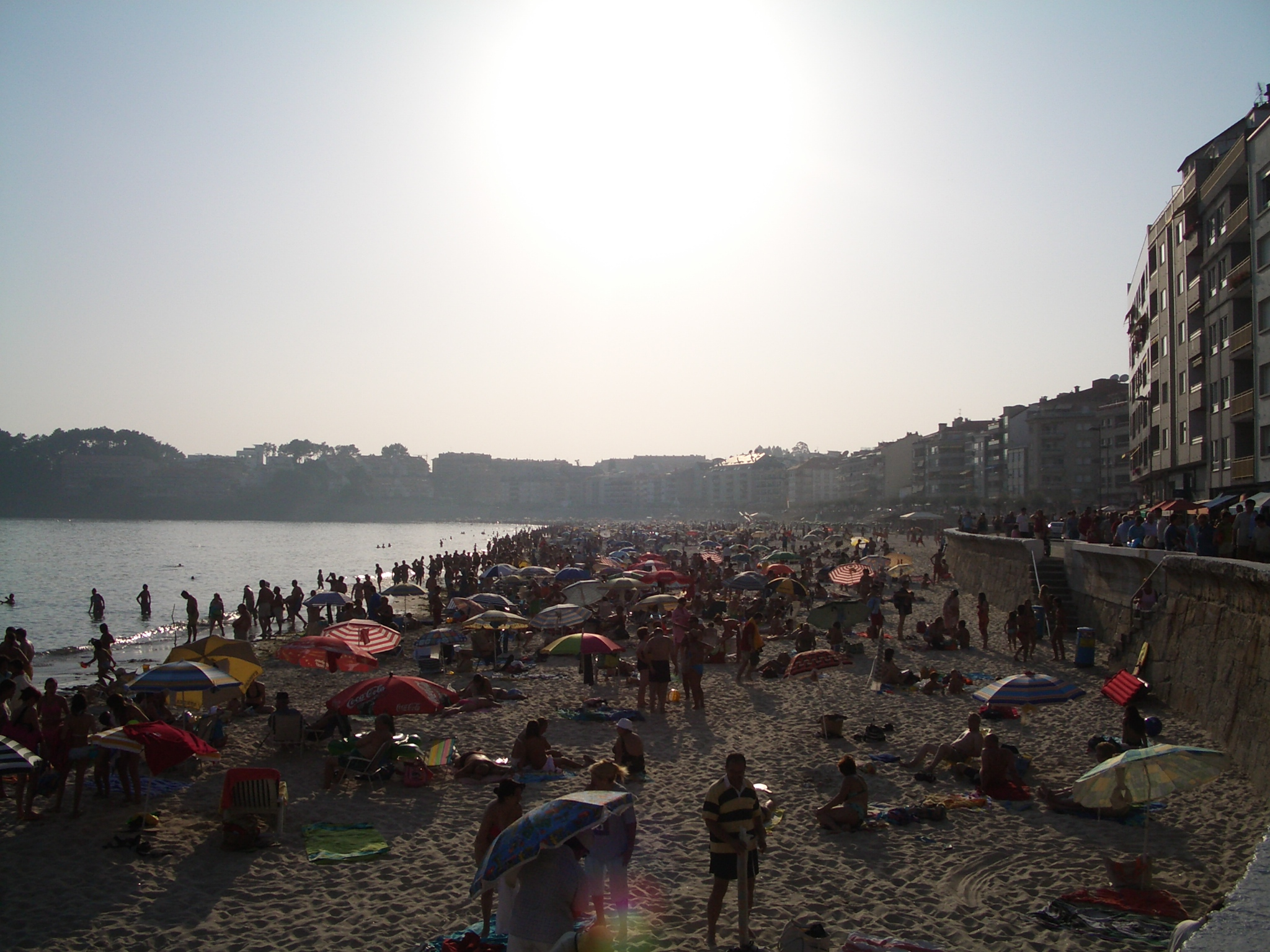
Beach of Silgar Sanxenxo

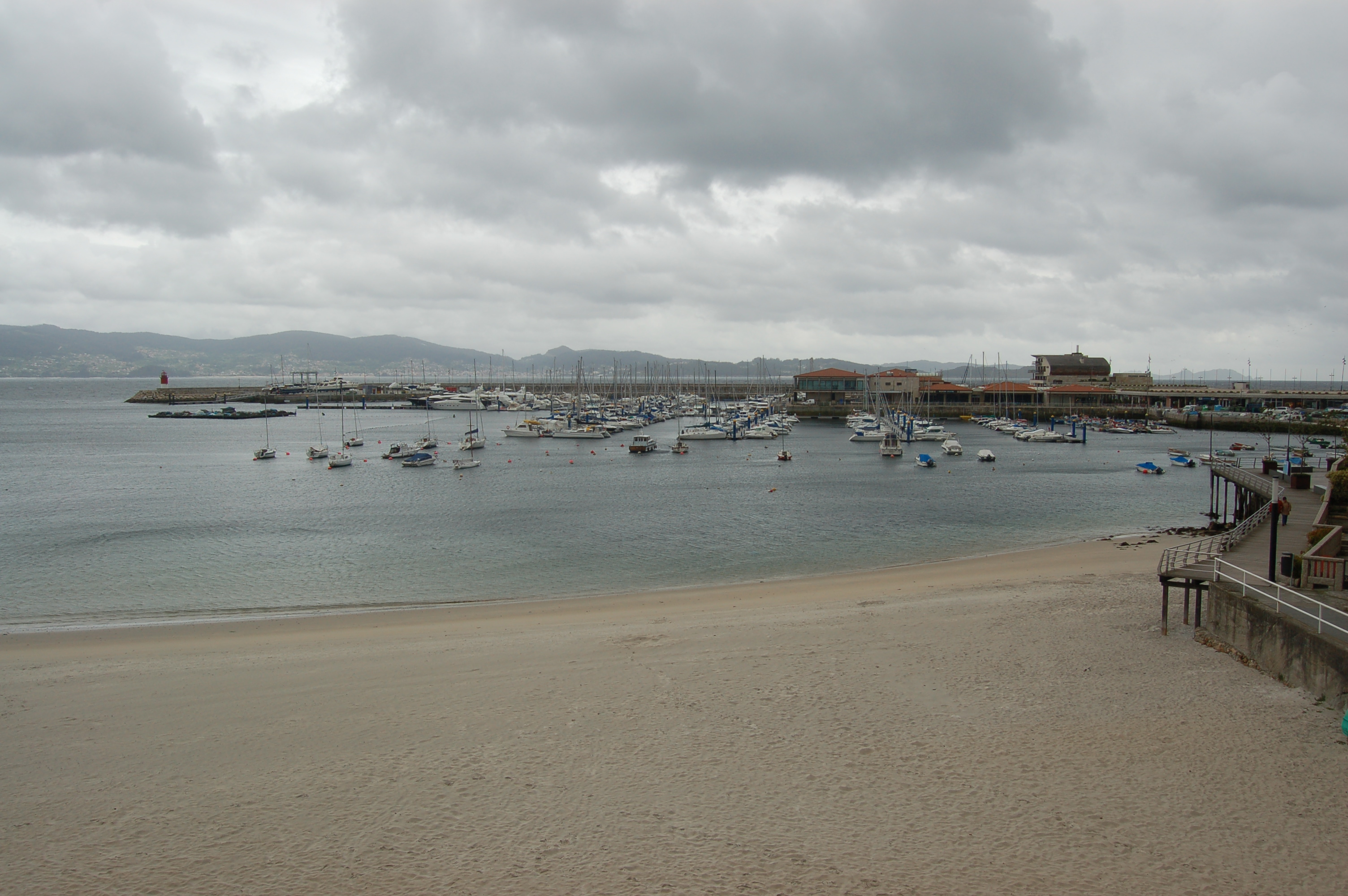
Harbor Sanxenxo

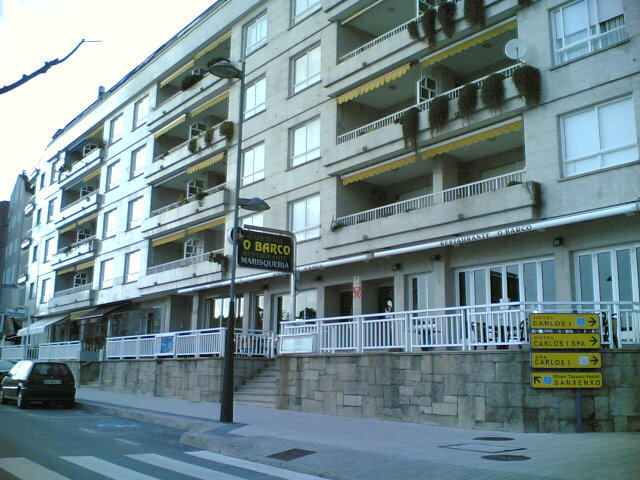
Street of Sanxenxo

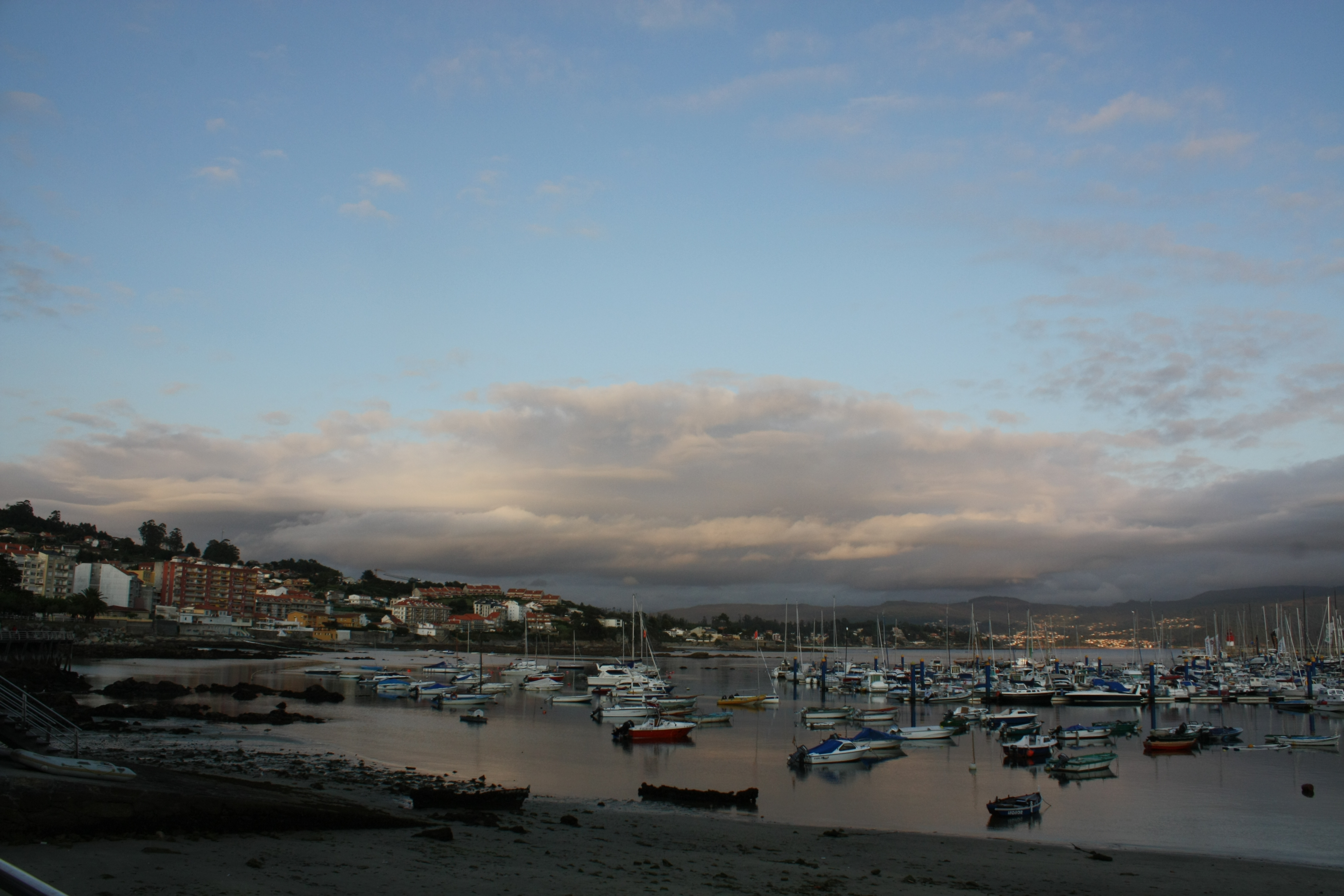
Harbour

== See also ==
- List of municipalities in Pontevedra
- Ria de Pontevedra
