= Vilagarcía de Arousa =

- Municipality
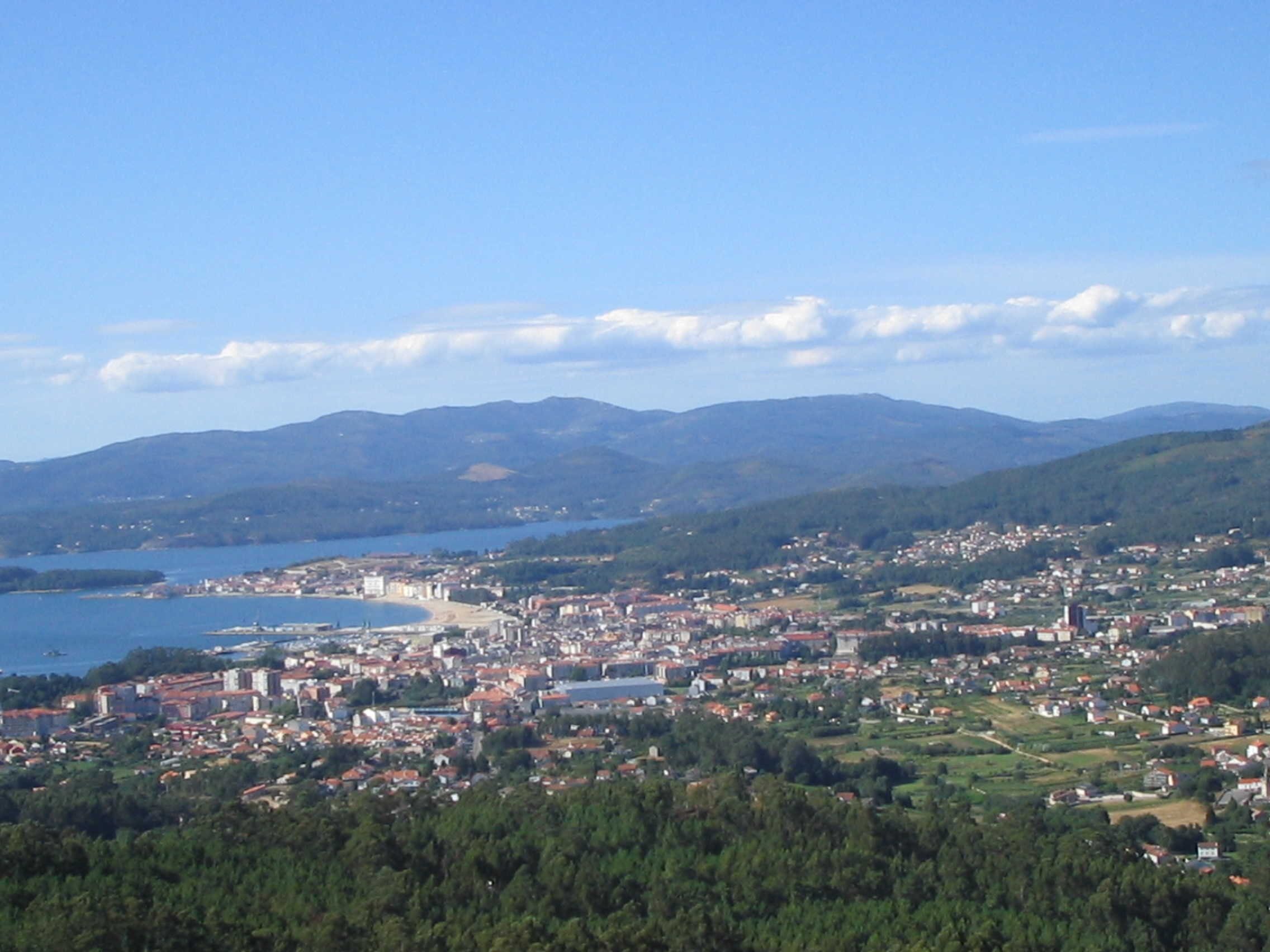
- Vilagarcía de Arousa

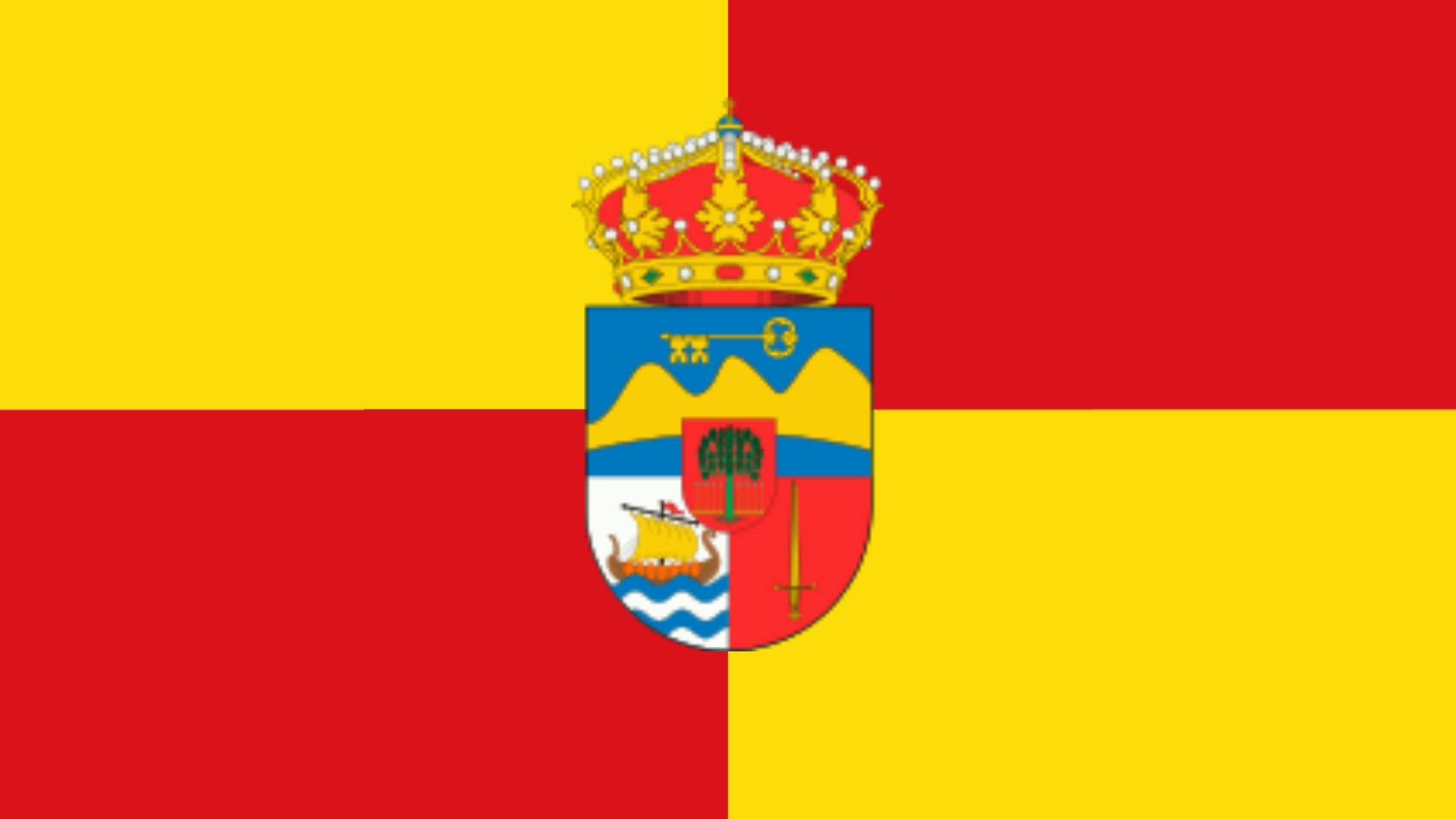
- Flag Coat of arms
- Nickname: Vilagarcía
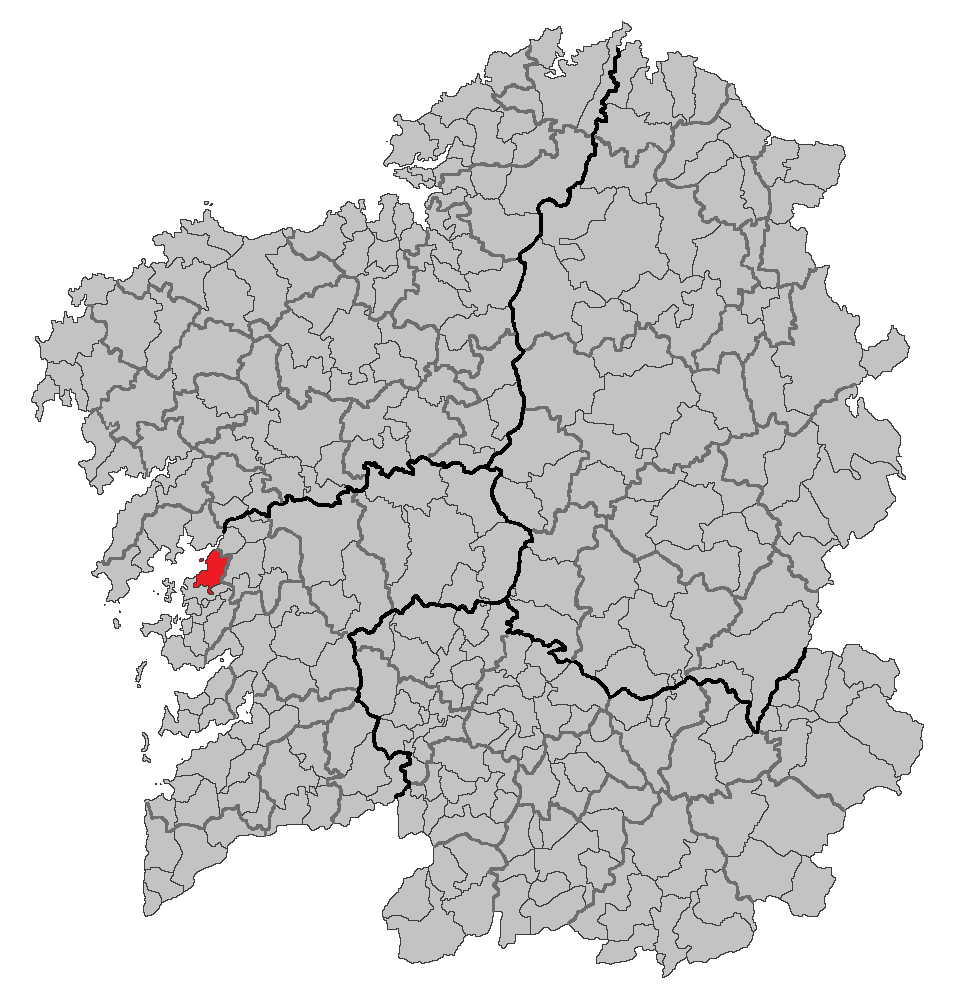
- Location of Vilagarcía de Arousa within Galicia
- Coordinates: 42.597713°N 8.763187°W
- Country: Spain
- Autonomous Community: Galicia
- Province: Pontevedra
- Comarca: O Salnés

Government
  - Type: Concello
  - Mayor: Alberto Varela Paz (PSdeG)

Area
  - Total: 47.14 km^{2} (18.20 sq mi)

Population (2025-01-01)
  - Total: 37,975
  - Density: 805.6/km^{2} (2,086/sq mi)
- Demonym: Vilagarciano
- Time zone: CET (GMT +1)
  - Summer (DST): CEST (GMT +2)
- Post code: 36600
- Patron saints: Santa Rita (22 May) San Roque (16 August)
- Website: www.vilagarcia.gal

Vilagarcía de Arousa (Galician: [ˌbilɐɣaɾˈθi.ɐ ð(e) aˈɾowsɐ], Spanish: [bilaɣaɾˈθi.a ðe aˈɾowsa]) is a municipality in the province of Pontevedra, in Galicia, Spain. As of 2014 it has a population of 37,712, being ninth largest town in Galicia.

== History ==
The present site of Vilagarcía has been occupied since prehistoric times. Petroglyphs depicting circular or deer shapes can be found in the parish of Bamio and can be dated to c. 2000 B.C.E. The castros of Alobre, Carril, Agudín and Lobeira, in addition to archaeological findings such as Roman or Visigothic coins, seem to indicate a continuous settlement in the area.

== Geography ==
=== Location ===
Vilagarcía de Arousa is located in the region (comarca) of O Salnés at the southernmost part of the ría de Arousa, Ría de Arousa forming a big sea inlet (ría). It borders to the North with Catoira, to the East with Caldas de Reis and to South with Vilanova de Arousa. It is located 45 km South of Santiago de Compostela.

=== Subdivisions ===
As it is traditional in Galicia, the city is subdivided in a number of parroquias, namely:

1. Arealonga (Santa Eulalia de Afora);
2. Bamio (San Xinés);
3. Carril (Santiago);
4. Cea (San Pedro);
5. Cornazo (San Pedro);
6. Fontecarmoa (San Pedro);
7. Rubiáns (Santa María);
8. Sobradelo (San Salvador);
9. Sobrán (San Martín de Afora);
10. Solobeira (San Félix);
11. Vilagarcía (Santa Eulalia e A Nosa Señora de la Junquera);
12. Carril (Santiago de Afuera).

== Port ==
The port of Vilagarcía de Arousa, with its 566,874 square meters approximately, is one of the most important components of the economy of this municipality and the region.

Although its activity dates back to the mid-nineteenth century, its origin is to be found in Carril, thanks to its intense trade relations "forced not only companies to have commercial representation in the estuary, but also their governments were forced to open diplomatic offices in Carril. The then booming town first and then Vilagarcía had consulates of Great Britain, Portugal, Germany, France, Argentina, Brazil, Chile, Mexico, Uruguay and the Dominican Republic".

Nowadays it is a significant point of export and import of goods, fishing and leisure activities.

== Festivals ==
- Festivals of Santa Rita.
- Festival of the San Roque.
- Festival of the Ameixa of Carril.

=== San Roque and the Festa da auga ===
The Patron Saint festival of Vilagarcía de Arousa takes place during 10 days around 16 August, the day of Saint Roch (San Roque). On that day two celebrations take place consecutively. The first one, of religious nature, starts with a mass and the procession of the image of the saint from the parish church (Iglesia de Santa Eulalia) to St. Roch's Chapel. Thousands of people accompany the image during its way, which is carried out moving to the beat of the Triunfo paso doble. Subsequently, the second celebration takes place, what is called Festa da Auga ("the water festival"). Thousands of people from all ages go through the streets shouting for water ("¡agua!"). The neighbors respond to their prayers by throwing water from the windows with buckets, hoses, etc. The goal is to get everybody wet. In addition, the city firefighters cooperate by drenching the participants from the firetrucks. The celebration does not end until the beginning of the evening. A certain area, comprising the main streets of the city, is designated as "the wet area", where getting wet is well received. Usually between 20,000 and 30,000 people take part in the Water festival.

== Notable people ==
- Dani Abalo, footballer
- Laura Alonso, operatic soprano
- Manuel Bernárdez, Uruguayan diplomat and writer
- Jéssica Bouzas Maneiro, tennis player
- Gustavo César, cyclist
- Luis César Sampedro, footballer
- Pablo Coira, footballer
- José Fontán, footballer
- Manuel Jiménez Abalo, footballer
- Antón Paz, sailor, winner of a gold medal at the 2008 Summer Olympics in the Mixed Tornado class
- Pepe Rubianes, actor
- Mari Paz Vilas, footballer

== Twin towns – sister cities ==
Vilagarcía de Arousa is twinned with:

- Matosinhos, Portugal

== See also ==
- List of municipalities in Pontevedra
