= 2016 Euro Beach Soccer League =

- Logo of the Superfinal of the 2016 EBSL (A new style of logo was introduced for the 2016 season, replacing the old style in use since 2009.)

Tournament details
- Host countries: Russia; Spain; Hungary; Italy
- Dates: 1 July – 28 August 2016
- Teams: 26 (from 1 confederation)
- Venue(s): 4 (in 4 host cities)

Final positions
- Champions: Ukraine (1st title)
- Runners-up: Portugal
- Third place: Russia
- Fourth place: Spain

Tournament statistics
- Matches played: 84
- Goals scored: 681 (8.11 per match)

Locations of the three stages and the Superfinal of the 2016 Euro Beach Soccer League

The 2016 Euro Beach Soccer League (EBSL) was the 19th edition of the annual, premier European competition in beach soccer contested between men's national teams, in a league and play-off format, taking place between 1 July and 28 August 2016.

This season a record 26 teams took part in two divisions. Twelve teams continued to contest Division A as in recent seasons, consisting of the top eleven finishers from the previous year plus Romania who were promoted. Whilst Division B was expanded to accommodate fourteen nations; those who did not gain promotion from the previous season, returning and debuting nations, plus Hungary who were relegated from the top tier.

This season there were three stages of fixtures. Each team from Division A played in two stages whilst each team from Division B played in one, earning points for the overall league tables.

At the end of the stages, according to the league tables, the eight best teams in Division A advanced to the Superfinal to compete to become the winners of this year's EBSL. Meanwhile, the top seven teams in Division B and the team ranked bottom of Division A played in the Promotion final to try to earn a spot in Division A next year.

Azerbaijan were promoted to Division A for the first time after beating Hungary in the Promotion Final who were looking to be promoted straight back up in their first season after relegation. Romania finished last in Division A and failed to defend their place in the Promotion Final and were therefore subsequently relegated straight back down to Division B having been promoted in 2015.

Ukraine won the league after a strong performance in the Superfinal, despite only finishing sixth after the preliminary three stages were complete, claiming their first EBSL title, defeating defending champions Portugal in the final in a repeat of the previous season's title deciding match.

== Calendar and Locations ==
Dates	Country	City	Stage
1–3 July	Russia	Moscow	Stage 1
8–10 July	Spain	Sanxenxo	Stage 2
12–14 August	Hungary	Siófok	Stage 3
25–28 August	Italy	Catania	Superfinal and Promotion Final

== Teams ==
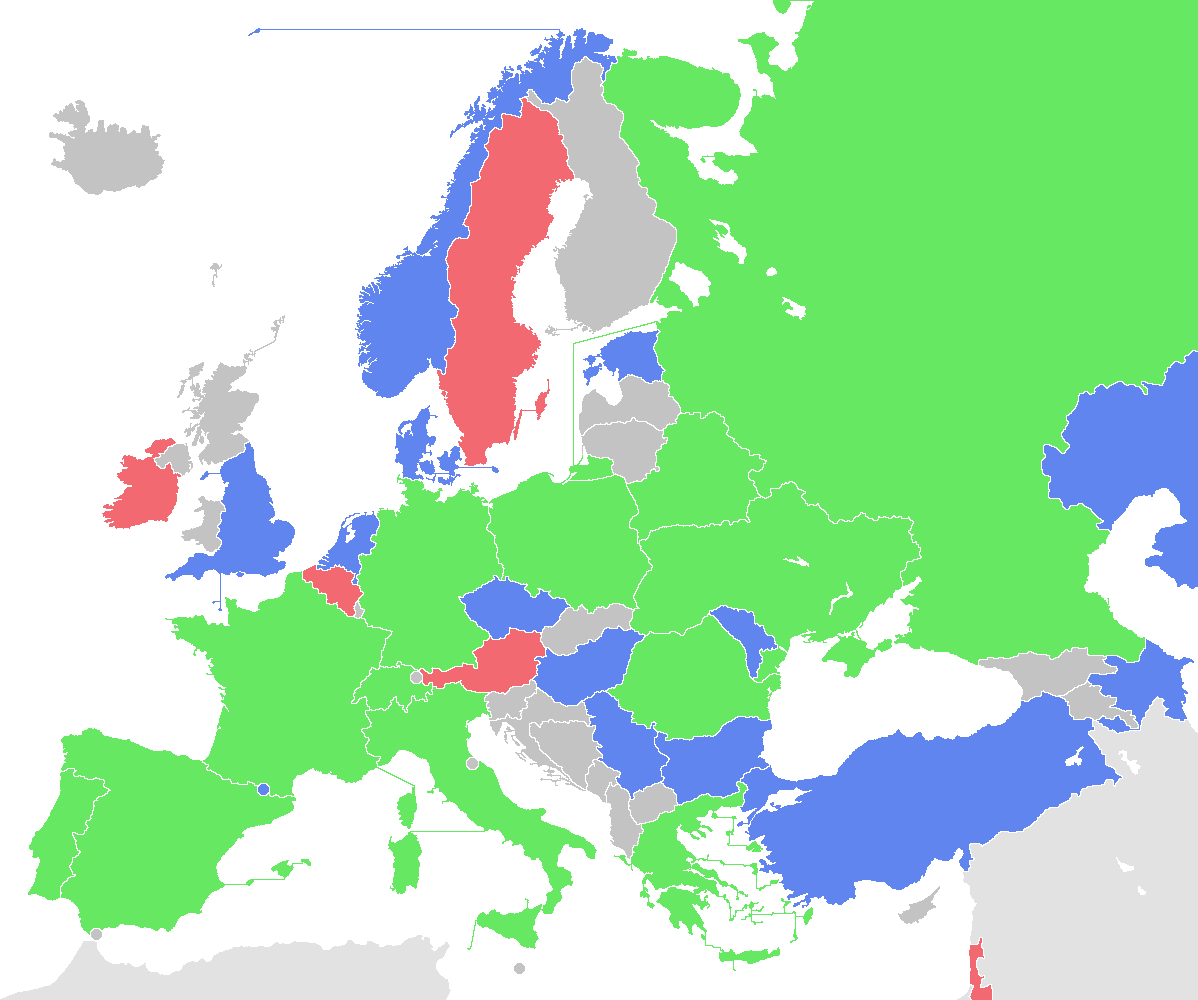
Competing in Division A Competing in Division B Competed in previous editions but not this year Never competed in the EBSL

The numbers in brackets show the European ranking of each team prior to the start of the league, out of 33 teams.

=== Division A ===
- Portugal (1st)
- Russia (2nd)
- Italy (3rd)
- Switzerland (4th)
- Spain (5th)
- Ukraine (6th)
- Belarus (8th)
- France (9th)
- Germany (11th)
- Poland (12th)
- Greece (13th)
- Romania (15th)

=== Division B ===
- Hungary (7th)
- England (10th)
- Azerbaijan (14th)
- Czech Republic (16th)
- Turkey (17th)
- Estonia (18th)
- Netherlands (19th)
- Norway (21st)
- Moldova (22nd)
- Bulgaria (23rd)
- Andorra (24th)
- Kazakhstan (30th)
- Denmark^{1} (31st)
- Serbia^{1} (n/a)

Notes:

1. Teams making their debut

== Stage 1 (Moscow, 1–3 July) ==
Matches are listed as local time in Moscow, (UTC+3)

All matches took place at Yantar Stadium in the district of Strogino.

=== Division A ===
==== Group 1 ====
Pos	Team	Pld	W	W+	WP	L	GF	GA	GD	Pts	Notes
1	Russia	3	2	0	1	0	14	9	+5	7	Group Winners
2	Switzerland	3	2	0	0	1	25	14	+11	6	
3	Poland	3	1	0	0	2	13	14	−1	3	
4	France	3	0	0	0	3	6	21	−15	0	

1 July 2016	Switzerland	10–4	France
16:45	Stankovic 1', 12'; Hodel 8', 16', 21' (pen.), 30' (pen.); Ott 8'; Spaccarotella 21', 26', 27'	Report(ru)	12' Marques; 32' Grandon; 34' Beaugrard; 36' Barbotti	Referee: Jude Amin Utulu (Malta)

1 July 2016	Poland	2–4	Russia
19:15	Krawczyk 14'; Baran 20'	Report(ru)	9' Krasheninnikov; 12' Romanov; 19' Kryshanov; 35' (pen.) Gorchinskii	Referee: Alfredo Balconi (Italy)

2 July 2016	Switzerland	8–3	Poland
16:45	Stankovic 14', 15', 18'; Spaccarotella 16'; Mo Jäggy 16', 22'; Wittlin 20'; Hodel 30'	Report(ru)	5', 16' Krawczyk; 20' Friszkemut	Referee: Laurynas Arzuolaitis (Lithuania)

2 July 2016	Russia	3–0	France
19:15	Makarov 7'; Leonov 21'; Paporotnyi 32'	Report(ru)		Referee: Eduards Borisevics (Latvia)

3 July 2016	France	2–8	Poland
16:45	Basquaise 22'; Beaugrard 34'	Report(ru)	1', 22', 30' Krawczyk; 4', 15' Baran; 18' Jesionowski; 19', 30' Lenart	Referee: Antonio Joaquim Pereira Almeida (Portugal)

3 July 2016	Russia	7–7 (a.e.t.) (4–3 p)	Switzerland
19:15	Artur Paporotnyi 7'; Romanov 10', 11'; Shkarin 12'; Krasheninnikov 23', 33'; Makarov 30'	Report(ru)	19', 28', 32', 33', 36' Stankovic; 23', 28' Spaccarotella	Referee: Jude Amin Utulu (Malta)
	Penalties
	Gorchinskii (penalty scored); Krasheninnikov (penalty scored); Makarov (penalty scored); Romanov (penalty scored)		(penalty scored) Stankovic; (penalty scored) Spaccarotella; (penalty scored) Misev; (penalty missed) Wittlin

==== Group 2 ====
Pos	Team	Pld	W	W+	WP	L	GF	GA	GD	Pts	Notes
1	Spain	3	3	0	0	0	13	6	+7	9	Group Winners
2	Italy	3	2	0	0	1	13	9	+4	6	
3	Belarus	3	1	0	0	2	10	7	+3	3	
4	Greece	3	0	0	0	3	6	20	−14	0	

1 July 2016	Italy	4–3	Belarus
15:30	Frainetti 6'; Palmacci 29'; Ramacciotti 32', 35'	Report (ru)	2' Slavutsin; 6' Kanstantinau; 10'Kamzolau	Referee: Laurynas Arzuolaitis (Lithuania)

1 July 2016	Greece	3–7	Spain
18:00	Papastathopoulos 2'; Triantafyllidis 8'; Kafantaris 33'	Report(ru)	1', 23' Cintas; 9' (pen.) Merida; 20', 22' Dris; 29' Pablo; 30' Ezequiel	Referee: Eduards Borisevics (Latvia)

2 July 2016	Italy	7–2	Greece
15:30	Palmacci 3', 8'; Gori 4' (pen.), 12', 16', 29'; Spada 21'	Report(ru)	14' Papaefstratiou; 27' Kafantaris	Referee: Jude Amin Utulu (Malta)

2 July 2016	Spain	2–1	Belarus
18:00	Cintas 10'; Pablo 21'	Report(ru)	32' Brishtel	Referee: Antonio Joaquim Pereira Almeida (Portugal)

3 July 2016	Belarus	6–1	Greece
15:30	Kamzolov 8'; Slavutin 9'; Samsonov 24', 29'; Brishtel 27'; Savich 31'	Report(ru)	8' Papastathopoulos	Referee: Eduards Borisevics (Latvia)

3 July 2016	Spain	4–2	Italy
18:00	Ezequiel 5'; Merida 21', 30'; Pajón 24'	Report(ru)	19' Corosiniti; 23' Ramacciotti	Referee: Laurynas Arzuolaitis (Lithuania)

==== Awards ====
Top scorer		Best player	Best goalkeeper	Ref.
(Switzerland) Dejan Stankovic	10 goals	(Russia) Kirill Romanov	(Spain) Dona	

=== Division B ===
Pos	Team	Pld	W	W+	WP	L	GF	GA	GD	Pts	Notes
1	Moldova	3	2	1	0	0	14	11	+3	8	Group Winners
2	Estonia	3	2	0	0	1	16	7	+9	6	
3	Serbia	3	1	0	0	2	12	17	−5	3	
4	Kazakhstan	3	0	0	0	3	10	17	−7	0	

1 July 2016	Moldova	4–3	Kazakhstan
13:00	Nicolaiciuc 12'; Podlesnov 19'; Trofim 32' (pen.); Negara 34'	Report(ru)	4' Tyulpa; 11', 21' Chernyshov	Referee: Oleksandr Gulyaev (Ukraine)

1 July 2016	Serbia	1–6	Estonia
14:15	Cubrilovic 5'	Report(ru)	6', 19', 23' Minlibajev; 8' Lepik; 19' Stuf; 22' Tammo	Referee: Denis Smoljaninov (Russia)

2 July 2016	Moldova	6–5	Serbia
13:00	Podlesnov 4'; Lascu 13'; Negara 24', 29' (pen.), 36'; Gojocari 28'	Report(ru)	10', 10', 19' Vucicevic; 17' Mijailovic; 20' Jovanoviz	Referee: Alfredo Balconi (Italy)

2 July 2016	Estonia	7–2	Kazakhstan
14:15	Minlibajev 14'; Munskind 19'; Lepik 23', 25'; Stüf 23', 27', 31'	Report(ru)	32' Makagon; 32' Chernyshov	Referee: Vitaly Levchenko (Russia)

3 July 2016	Kazakhstan	5–6	Serbia
13:00	Vasilyev 20'; Perevyortov 25', 26'; Chernyshov 32'; Kvyatovsky 35'	Report(ru)	3', 11', 33' Vucicevic; 13' Cubrilovic; 24' Antic; 32' Jovanovic	Referee: Eliz Topaloğlu (Turkey)

3 July 2016	Estonia	3–4 (a.e.t.)	Moldova
14:15	Rump 3'; Tammo 20'; Lepik 29'	Report(ru)	2', 15', 37' Negara; 31' Lascu	Referee: Vitaly Levchenko (Russia)

== Stage 2 (Sanxenxo, 8–10 July) ==
Matches are listed as local time in Sanxenxo, (UTC+2)

All matches took place at a purpose built stadium on Silgar Beach.

=== Division A ===
==== Group 1 ====
Pos	Team	Pld	W	W+	WP	L	GF	GA	GD	Pts	Notes
1	Spain	3	3	0	0	0	20	6	+14	9	Group Winners
2	Ukraine	3	2	0	0	1	13	8	+5	6	
3	France	3	1	0	0	2	8	19	−11	3	
4	Romania	3	0	0	0	3	10	18	−8	0	

8 July 2016	Ukraine	5–1	France
16:45	Voitok 20', 25'; Medved 21'; Zborovskyi 27'; Voitenko 28'	Report(ru)	13' Marques	Referee: Lukasz Ostrowski (Poland)

8 July 2016	Romania	2–7	Spain
19:15	Ciocanel 15'; Zaharia 26'	Report(ru)	3', 36' Kuman; 3', 17' Antonio; 6', 20' Dris; 26' Cintas	Referee: Ago Kartmann(Estonia)

9 July 2016	Ukraine	7–5	Romania
16:45	Zborovskyi 2', 36'; Korniychuk 13', 14'; Budzko 24'; Voitok 31', 32'	Report(ru)	14', 23', 27' Maci; 22' Zaharia; 28' Ciocanel	Referee: Giuseppe Sicurella (Italy)

9 July 2016	Spain	11–3	France
19:15	Merida 1', 1'; Antonio 1', 21', 28'; Tracisto 5', 31'; Guisado 6'; Kuman 10', 11'; Cintas 21'	Report(ru)	1' Marques; 28' Basquaise; 28' Grandon	Referee: Francisco Henriques Costa (Portugal)

10 July 2016	France	4–3	Romania
17:15	Barbotti 1', 3', 8', 20'	Report(ru)	24' Poste; 25' Tanase; 33' Croitoru	Referee: Ago Kartmann (Estonia)

10 July 2016	Spain	2–1	Ukraine
19:15	Dris 12'; Tracisto 15'	Report(ru)	4' Korniichuk	Referee: Alexandre Soares (Brazil)

==== Group 2 ====
Pos	Team	Pld	W	W+	WP	L	GF	GA	GD	Pts	Notes
1	Switzerland	3	3	0	0	0	18	9	+9	9	Group Winners
2	Portugal	3	2	0	0	1	16	6	+10	6	
3	Germany	3	1	0	0	2	8	20	−12	3	
4	Greece	3	0	0	0	3	8	15	−7	0	

8 July 2016	Switzerland	10–4	Germany
15:30	Stankovic 2', 25', 25'; Spaccarotella 13'; Ott 16', 20', 21', 24', 28'; Misev 33'	Report(ru)	1' Thürk; 25', 34' Biermann; 33' Weirauch	Referee: Manolo Picchio (Italy)

8 July 2016	Greece	3–6	Portugal
18:00	Kafantaris 13'; Biris 16'; Karakasis 36'	Report(ru)	9' Santos; 16' Alan; 21' Belchior; 23', 29' Fonseca; 28' Madjer	Referee: Pablo Brea (Spain)

9 July 2016	Switzerland	6–4	Greece
15:30	Valentin Jäggy 3'; Hodel 5'; Stankovic 9'; Wittlin 14'; Ott 22'; Spaccarotella 33'	Report(ru)	14', 26' Papaefstratiou; 15' Kafantaris; 16' (o.g.) Micev	Referee: Tomasz Winiarczyk (Poland)

9 July 2016	Portugal	9–1	Germany
18:00	Belchior 1', 14' (pen.), 19'; Bê Martins 7'; Torres 8'; Tavares 9'; Biermann 10' (o.g.); Santos 15'; Coimbra 18'	Report(ru)	31' Thürk	Referee: Lukasz Ostrowski (Poland)

10 July 2016	Germany	3–1	Greece
16:10	Biermann 9'; Thürk 15'; Olli 20'	Report(ru)	10' Papastathopoulos	Referee: Manolo Picchio (Italy)

10 July 2016	Portugal	1–2	Switzerland
18:00	Santos 21'	Report(ru)	17' Schirinzi; 27' Misev	Referee: Pablo Brea (Spain)

==== Awards ====
Top scorer		Best player	Best goalkeeper	Ref.
(Switzerland) Noël Ott	6 goals	(Spain) Miguel Santiso ("Kuman")	(Portugal) Elinton Andrade	

=== Division B ===
==== Group 1 ====
Pos	Team	Pld	W	W+	WP	L	GF	GA	GD	Pts	Notes
1	Czech Rep.	2	2	0	0	0	8	6	+2	6	Group Winners
2	Norway	2	1	0	0	1	8	8	0	3	
3	Netherlands	2	0	0	0	2	5	7	−2	0	

8 July 2016	Czech Rep.	3–2	Netherlands
14:15	Kampman 6' (o.g.); Vyhnal 20'; Chalupa 30'	Report(ru)	24', 29' Donkers	Referee: Alexandre Soares (Brazil)

9 July 2016	Norway	4–3	Netherlands
14:15	Li 2'; Jacobsen 18'; Salveson 21', 25'	Report(ru)	2' Wolf; 28' Donker; 29' Donkers	Referee: Hari Christien (Belgium)

10 July 2016	Czech Rep.	5–4	Norway
13:45	Radosta 4'; Salák 11', 19'; Huráb 19'; Vyhnal 24'	Report(ru)	12' Salveson; 23' Li; 24', 34' Nergaard	Referee: Jurijs Ivunsis (Lithuania)

==== Group 2 ====
Pos	Team	Pld	W	W+	WP	L	GF	GA	GD	Pts	Notes
1	England	2	1	0	1	0	6	2	+4	4	Group Winners
2	Turkey	2	1	0	0	1	6	3	+3	3	
3	Andorra	2	0	0	0	2	3	10	−7	0	

8 July 2016	England	5–1	Andorra
13:00	Lawson 7', 31'; Clarke 28'; Morris 28'; O'Neill 30'	Report(ru)	25' Neira	Referee: Alexander Berezkin (Russia)

9 July 2016	Turkey	5–2	Andorra
13:00	Baris 9'; Demir 16'; Keskin 23' (pen.), 34'; Anzafioglu 27'	Report(ru)	16' Fernandez; 24' Martínez	Referee: Raúl Martín González Francés (Spain)

10 July 2016	England	1–1 (a.e.t.) (3–1 p)	Turkey
12:30	Bowes 8'	Report(ru)	28' Seyit	Referee: Tomasz Winiarczyk (Poland)
	Penalties
	O'Neill (penalty scored); O'Rourke (penalty scored); Farquharson (penalty scored)		(penalty missed) Keskin; (penalty scored) Demir

== Stage 3 (Siófok, 12–14 August) ==
Matches are listed as local time in Siófok, (UTC+2)

All matches took place at Mlsz Beach Arena.

=== Division A ===
==== Group 1 ====
Pos	Team	Pld	W	W+	WP	L	GF	GA	GD	Pts	Notes
1	Belarus	3	3	0	0	0	14	6	+8	9	Group Winners
2	Russia	3	2	0	0	1	11	7	+4	6	
3	Portugal	3	1	0	0	2	12	8	+4	3	
4	Romania	3	0	0	0	3	6	22	−16	0	

12 August 2016	Russia	0–2	Belarus
14:45		Report(ru)	12' Samsonov; 34' Bryshtel	Referee: Ago Kartmann (Estonia)

12 August 2016	Romania	0–7	Portugal
17:15		Report(ru)	7' Bê Martins; 9', 27' Madjer; 18' Alan; 30' Coimbra; 31', 35' Novo	Referee: Lukasz Ostrowski (Poland)

13 August 2016	Russia	7–2	Romania
14:45	Shishin 5', 22'; Paporotnyi 13'; Krasheninnikov 15'; Pankratov 25' (pen.), 36'; Kryshanov 34'	Report(ru)	13', 30' Maciuca	Referee: Csaba Baghy (Hungary)

13 August 2016	Portugal	2–4	Belarus
17:15	Novo 12'; Madjer 31'	Report(ru)	4', 31' (pen.), 32' Brishtel; 15' Samsonov	Referee: Jorge Moya Garcia (Spain)

14 August 2016	Belarus	8–4	Romania
14:45	Samsonov 6'; Bokach 8', 13', 33'; Miranovich 9'; Bryshtel 22', 32'; Kamzolov 30'	Report(ru)	5' Croitoru; 16' Ciocanel; 21' Ravoiu; 35' Maciuca	Referee: Jorge Moya Garcia (Spain)

14 August 2016	Portugal	3–4	Russia
17:15	Alan 12'; Fonseca 24'; Belchior 26'	Report(ru)	15' Kryshanov; 16' Krasheninnikov; 19', 32' Shishin	Referee: Christian Zimmermann (Switzerland)

==== Group 2 ====
Pos	Team	Pld	W	W+	WP	L	GF	GA	GD	Pts	Notes
1	Italy	3	2	0	0	1	13	8	+5	6	Group Winners
2	Ukraine	3	1	0	1	1	9	4	+5	4	
3	Germany	3	1	0	0	2	7	12	−5	3	
4	Poland	3	0	0	1	2	11	16	−5	1	

12 August 2016	Italy	5–1	Germany
13:30	Di Palma 9'; Marinai 11'; Gori 12', 25'; Ramacciotti 17'	Report(ru)	28' Biermann	Referee: Laurynas Arzuolaitis (Lithuania)

12 August 2016	Poland	3–3 (a.e.t.) (2–0 p)	Ukraine
16:00	Baran 19'; Saganowski 21'; Ziober 35'	Report(ru)	15', 25' Zborovskyi; 18' Glutskyi	Referee: Jude Amin Utulu (Malta)
	Penalties
	Saganowski (penalty scored); Baran (penalty scored)		(penalty missed) Voitok; (penalty missed) Korniichuk

13 August 2016	Italy	7–6	Poland
13:30	Gori 3', 18'; Marucci 4'; Palmacci 14', 25'; Zurlo 20', 32'	Report(ru)	4', 18' Ziober; 13', 28' Saganowski; 15' Jesionowski; 36' Poplawski	Referee: Laszlo Legeza (Hungary)

13 August 2016	Ukraine	5–0	Germany
16:00	Sydorenko 7'; Korniychuk 8'; Zborovskyi 14' (pen.), 34'; Medved 25'	Report(ru)		Referee: Ago Kartmann (Estonia)

14 August 2016	Germany	6–2	Poland
13:30	Biermann 12', 36' (pen.); Sousa da Silva 13'; Baran 20' (o.g.); Göttlich 21'; Romrig 26'	Report(ru)	6' Ziober; 7' Saganowski

14 August 2016	Ukraine	1–1 (a.e.t.) (3–1 p)	Italy
16:00	Medved 4'	Report(ru)	17' Corosiniti
	Penalties
	Korniichuk (penalty scored); Shcherytsia (penalty scored); Glutskyi (penalty scored)		(penalty missed) Palmacci; (penalty scored) Ramacciotti

==== Awards ====
Top scorer		Best player	Best goalkeeper	Ref.
(Belarus) Ihar Bryshtel	6 goals	(Italy) Gabriele Gori	(Belarus) Valery Makarevich	

=== Division B ===
Pos	Team	Pld	W	W+	WP	L	GF	GA	GD	Pts	Notes
1	Azerbaijan	3	3	0	0	0	13	4	+9	9	Group Winners
2	Hungary	3	2	0	0	1	16	11	+5	6	
3	Bulgaria	3	1	0	0	2	10	18	–8	3	
4	Denmark	3	0	0	0	3	11	17	−6	0	

12 August 2016	Azerbaijan	7–2	Bulgaria
12:15	Mammadov 9', 10', 14'; Aliyev 12'; Allahguliyev 22', 24'; Baghirov 23'	Report(ru)	25' Martinov; 31' Adamov	Referee: Vlad Nicolae Ciobanu (Romania)

12 August 2016	Denmark	5–9	Hungary
18:30	Raedkjaer 5', 23' (pen.); Vigilsen Wiese 18'; Olsen 26' (pen.), 36'	Report(ru)	3' Fekete; 5', 12' (pen.) Simonyi; 8', 21' Balazs; 9' Sebestyen; 12' Szentes-Biro; 27' Turos; 29' Besenyei	Referee: Eduards Borisevics (Latvia)

13 August 2016	Azerbaijan	3–2	Denmark
12:15	Baghirov 3'; Sultanov 16'; Allahguliyev 30'	Report(ru)	3' Raedkjaer; 15' Larsen	Referee: Laurynas Arzuolaitis (Lithuania)

13 August 2016	Hungary	7–3	Bulgaria
18:30	Turos 3', 17', 24', 32' (pen.); Berkes 25'; Sebestyen 26'; Besenyei 36'	Report(ru)	17' (o.g.) Szentes-Biro; 20' (pen.) Iliev; 23' Velikov	Referee: Christian Zimmermann (Switzerland)

14 August 2016	Bulgaria	5–4	Denmark
10:45	Filipov 4', 12'; Parashkevov 8'; Tsvetkov 12'; Velikov 28'	Report(ru)	7', 10' (pen.), 14' Raedkjaer; 12' Olsen	Referee: Emmanuel Vocale (Belgium)

14 August 2016	Hungary	0–3	Azerbaijan
18:20		Report(ru)	3' Allahguliyev; 12' Zeynalov; 24' Sultanov	Referee: Lukasz Ostrowski (Poland)

== League Tables ==
At stage completion

Ranking & tie-breaking criteria: Division A – 1. Points earned 2. Goal difference 3. Goals scored | Division B – 1. Highest group placement 2. Points earned 3. Goal difference 4. Goals scored 5. Results against 4th place team

=== Division A ===
Pos	Team	Pld	W	W+	WP	L	GF	GA	GD	Pts	Notes
1	Spain	6	6	0	0	0	33	12	+21	18	Advance to Superfinal
2	Switzerland	6	5	0	0	1	43	23	+20	15	Advance to Superfinal
3	Russia	6	4	0	1	1	25	16	+9	13	Advance to Superfinal
4	Belarus	6	4	0	0	2	24	13	+11	12	Advance to Superfinal
5	Italy	6	4	0	0	2	26	17	+9	12	Advance to Superfinal
6	Ukraine	6	3	0	1	2	22	12	+10	10	Advance to Superfinal
7	Portugal	6	3	0	0	3	28	14	+14	9	Advance to Superfinal
8	Germany	6	2	0	0	4	15	32	−17	6	Advance to Superfinal
9	Poland	6	1	0	1	4	24	30	−6	4	
10	France	6	1	0	0	5	14	40	−26	3	
11	Greece	6	0	0	0	6	14	35	−21	0	
12	Romania	6	0	0	0	6	16	40	−24	0	Promotion Final

=== Division B ===
Pos	Team	Pld	W	W+	WP	L	GF	GA	GD	Pts	Notes
1	Azerbaijan (Q) ●	2	2	0	0	0	10	2	+8	6	Promotion Final
2	Czech Rep. (Q) ●	2	2	0	0	0	8	6	+2	6	Promotion Final
3	Moldova (Q) ●	2	1	1	0	0	10	8	+2	5	Promotion Final
4	England (Q) ●	2	1	0	1	0	6	2	+4	4	Promotion Final
5	Estonia (q) ●	2	1	0	0	1	9	5	+4	3	Promotion Final
6	Turkey (q) ●	2	1	0	0	1	6	3	+3	3	Promotion Final
7	Hungary (q) ●	2	1	0	0	1	7	6	+1	3	Promotion Final
8	Norway ●	2	1	0	0	1	8	8	0	3	
9	Netherlands ●	2	0	0	0	2	5	7	−2	0	
10	Serbia ●	2	0	0	0	2	6	12	−6	0	
11	Andorra ●	2	0	0	0	2	3	10	−7	0	
12	Bulgaria ●	2	0	0	0	2	5	14	−9	0	
13	Denmark ●	3	0	0	0	3	11	17	−6	0	
14	Kazakhstan ●	3	0	0	0	3	10	17	−7	0	

Note: Since one group in Division B consisted of just three teams, for the teams who finished in 1st, 2nd or 3rd in a group of four, their results against the 4th placed team in their groups have been discounted.

Team group placement: ● 1st place / ● 2nd place / ● 3rd place / ● 4th place

(Q) – Qualified to Promotion Final as group winner
(q) – Qualified Promotion Final as best non-winners

== Promotion Final (Catania, 25–28 August) ==
=== Qualified teams ===
Teams in bold qualified as group winners. The team in italics attempted to retain their position in Division A, having finished bottom of the table.

- **Moldova**
- **Czech Republic**
- **England**
- **Azerbaijan**
- Hungary
- Estonia
- Turkey
- Romania (Last place, Division A)

=== Group stage ===
Matches are listed as local time in Catania, (UTC+2)

All matches took place at the DomusBet Arena Beach Stadium with a capacity of 2 000.

==== Group 1 ====
Pos	Team	Pld	W	W+	WP	L	GF	GA	GD	Pts	Notes
1	Hungary	3	3	0	0	0	19	11	+8	**9**	Advance to final
2	Estonia	3	1	0	1	1	10	10	0	**4**	Classification matches
3	Romania	3	1	0	0	2	16	15	+1	**3**	Classification matches
4	Moldova	3	0	0	0	3	9	18	–9	**0**	Classification matches

25 August 2016	**Moldova**	**2–4**	**Estonia**
10:15	Negara 3'; Ciopa 30'	Report(ru)	17' Mäerog; 23' (o.g.) Eremia; 28' Truusalu; 36' Munskind	Referee: Vitalij Gomolko (Lithuania)

25 August 2016	**Hungary**	**9–4**	**Romania**
12:45	Szentes-Biro 4', 26'; Turos 15'; Besenyei 15', 17'; Patocs 22'; Balazs 23'; Berkes 23'; Csoszanszki 26'	Report(ru)	2' Maciuca; 12' Carauleanu; 27' Florea Ionut; 34' Ciocanel	Referee: Christian Zimmermann (Switzerland)

26 August 2016	**Moldova**	**4–5**	**Hungary**
10:15		Report(ru)

26 August 2016	**Romania**	**3–3** (**2–3** p)	**Estonia**
12:45		Report(ru)

27 August 2016	**Estonia**	**3–5**	**Hungary**
11:15		Report(ru)

27 August 2016	**Romania**	**9–3**	**Moldova**
13:45		Report(ru)

==== Group 2 ====
Pos	Team	Pld	W	W+	WP	L	GF	GA	GD	Pts	Notes
1	Azerbaijan	3	3	0	0	0	12	4	+8	**9**	Advance to final
2	England	3	1	0	0	2	10	7	+3	**3**	Classification matches
3	Turkey	3	1	0	0	2	10	12	–2	**3**	Classification matches
4	Czech Republic	3	1	0	0	2	6	15	–9	**3**	Classification matches

25 August 2016	**Czech Republic**	**1–7**	**England**
9:00	Salak 15'	Report(ru)	1' Farquharson; 7', 25' Clarke; 10', 16', 26' Day; 31' Lawson	Referee: Oleg Cebotari (Moldova)

25 August 2016	**Turkey**	**3–5**	**Azerbaijan**
11:30	Seyit 10'; Semih 13'; Keskin 13'	Report(ru)	12' Mammadov; 12', 16' Hajiyev; 23' Allahguliyev; 31' Aliyev	Referee: Csaba Baghy (Hungary)

26 August 2016	**Czech Republic**	**4–3**	**Turkey**
9:00	Vyhnal 16'; Kovařík 24', 27'; Radosta 25'	Report(ru)	3' Erkan; 12' Keskin; 33' (o.g.) Hurab

26 August 2016	**Azerbaijan**	**2–0**	**England**
11:40	Allahguliyev 23'; Baghirov 25'	Report(ru)		Referee: Sergio Filipe Gomes Soares (Portugal)

27 August 2016	**England**	**3–4**	**Turkey**
9:00	Farquharson 26'; Temple 33'; Bowes 36'	Report(ru)	8', 23' Yesilirmak; 28' Keskin; 31' Seyit	Referee: Oleg Cebotari (Moldova)

27 August 2016	**Azerbaijan**	**5–1**	**Czech Republic**
11:30	Mammadov 6'; Guliyev 15'; Aliyev 21', 30'; Kovarik 21' (o.g.)	Report(ru)	36' Kovarik	Referee: Vitalij Gomolko (Lithuania)

=== Play-offs ===
==== Seventh place play-off ====
28 August 2016
09:00

Moldova	2–3	Czech Republic
Ignat 7', 34'	Report(ru)	1' (pen.) Salak; 6' Kovarik; 22' Vyhnal

==== Fifth place play-off ====
28 August 2016
10:15

Romania	4–8	Turkey
Maciuca ?', ?', ?'; Tanase ?'	Report(ru)	?' Keskin ?' Terzioglu ?', ?' Sinç ?', ?' Anzafioglu ?', ?' Yesilirmak

==== Third place play-off ====
28 August 2016
14:00

Estonia	2–4	England
Minlibajev 7'; Truusalu 29'	Report(ru)	18' Temple; 24' (pen.) Clarke; 26' Day; 27' Bowes

Referee: Christian Zimmermann (Switzerland)

==== Promotion play-off final ====
28 August 2016
15:15

Hungary	5–5 (a.e.t.)	Azerbaijan
Besenyei 6', 18', 36', 36'; Csoszanszki 6'	Report(ru)	6', 26' Allahguliyev; 25' Aliyev; 31', 35' Mammadov
Penalties
Sebestyen (penalty scored); Csoszanszki (penalty scored); Szentes-Biro (penalty scored); Rutai (penalty missed); Berkes (penalty missed)	3–4	(penalty scored) Sultanov; (penalty scored) Zeynalov; (penalty scored) Nazarov; (penalty missed) Baghirov; (penalty scored) Mammadov

Referee: Lukasz Ostrowski (Poland)

=== Final standings ===
Pos	Team	Qualification
**1**	**Azerbaijan**	**Promoted to 2017 EBSL Division A**
2	Hungary	Remain in Division B
3	England	Remain in Division B
4	Estonia	Remain in Division B
5	Turkey	Remain in Division B
6	Romania	Relegated to 2017 EBSL Division B
7	Czech Republic	Remain in Division B
8	Moldova	Remain in Division B

Italics: team from Division A

== Superfinal (Catania, 25–28 August) ==
=== Qualified Teams ===
- Spain
- Switzerland
- Russia
- Belarus
- Italy
- Ukraine
- Portugal
- Germany

=== Group stage ===
Matches are listed as local time in Catania, (UTC+2)

All matches took place at the DomusBet Arena Beach Stadium with a capacity of 2 000.

==== Group 1 ====
Pos	Team	Pld	W	W+	WP	L	GF	GA	GD	Pts	Notes
1	Ukraine	3	3	0	0	0	16	10	+6	9	Advance to final
2	Spain	3	1	1	0	1	14	11	+3	5	Classification matches
3	Belarus	3	1	0	0	2	13	10	+3	3	Classification matches
4	Germany	3	0	0	0	3	5	17	–12	0	Classification matches

25 August 2016	Belarus	4–5	Ukraine
14:00	Samsonov 5', 21'; Bryshtel 14'; Kamzolau 32'	Report(ru)	4', 22' Zborovskyi; 5' Shcherytsia; 21' Voitok; 29' Korniychuk	Referee: Antonio Joaquim Pereira Almeida (Portugal)

25 August 2016	Germany	2–6	Spain
16:40	Bequiri 20'; Thurk 31'	Report(ru)	2' Eduard; 13', 20' (pen.) Antonio; 20' Cintas; 31' Ezequiel; 33' Juanma	Referee: Alfredo Balconi (Italy)

26 August 2016	Belarus	7–2	Germany
14:10	Makarevich 8'; Miranovich 10'; Samsonov 11', 18'; Brishtel 16'; Kanstantsinau 22', 25'	Report(ru)	12' Schmitt; 27' Thürk	Referee: Christian Zimmermann (Switzerland)

26 August 2016	Spain	5–7	Ukraine
16:45	Carrera Tracisto 1', 10'; Cintas 16', 24'; Gomez 16'	Report(ru)	9', 16', 23' Medved; 11' Riabchuk; 15' (pen.) Makeiev; 28' Shcherytsia; 34' Voitok	Referee: Sofien Benchabane (France)

27 August 2016	Ukraine	4–1	Germany
15:00	Panteleichuk 4'; Korniychuk 19', 32'; Zborovskyi 31'	Report(ru)	24' (o.g.) Glutskyi	Referee: Alfredo Balconi (Italy)

27 August 2016	Spain	3–2 (a.e.t.)	Belarus
17:30	Carrera Tracisto 3'; Ardil 22'; Cintas 39'	Report(ru)	34' Bryshtel; 34' Miranovich

==== Group 2 ====
Pos	Team	Pld	W	W+	WP	L	GF	GA	GD	Pts	Notes
1	Portugal	3	2	0	0	1	13	12	+1	6	Advance to final
2	Russia	3	1	1	0	1	11	8	+3	5	Classification matches
3	Italy	3	1	0	0	2	14	15	–1	3	Classification matches
4	Switzerland	3	0	0	1	2	13	16	–3	1	Classification matches

25 August 2016	Portugal	6–5	Switzerland
15:15	Léo Martins 5', 11'; Novo 11', 24'; Bê Martins 11'; Santos 13'	Report(ru)	7' Mo Jäggy; 7', 25' Stankovic; 23' Spaccarotella; 29' Hodel	Referee: Lukasz Ostrowski (Poland)

25 August 2016	Russia	5–3	Italy
17:55	Nikonorov 3'; Ilinskii 12'; Makarov 16'; Paporotnyi 24'; Shkarin 35'	Report(ru)	9', 29' (pen.) Palmacci; 16' Frainetti	Referee: Jude Amin Utulu (Malta)

26 August 2016	Russia	3–2 (a.e.t.)	Portugal
16:25	Romanov 5'; Nikonorov 33'; Shkarin 39' (pen.)	Report(ru)	5', 29' Coimbra	Referee: Mikhail Prokharav (Belarus)

26 August 2016	Switzerland	5–7	Italy
18:05	Valentin Jäggy 12'; Hodel 16'; Mo Jäggy 25'; Stankovic 27', 32'	Report(ru)	5' Frainetti; 11', 36', 36' Palmacci; 23' Marinai; 27' Zurlo; 35' di Palma	Referee: Ingilab Mammadov (Azerbaijan)

27 August 2016	Switzerland	3–3 (a.e.t.) (3–2 p)	Russia
16:15	Hodel 5'; Ott 29'; Stankovic 31'	Report(ru)	5' Romanov; 16' Ilinskii; 34' Shkarin	Referee: Csaba Baghy (Hungary)
	Penalties
	Ott (penalty scored); Mo Jäggy (penalty scored); Stankovic (penalty scored)		(penalty scored) Aksenov; (penalty missed) Makarov; (penalty scored) Romanov

27 August 2016	Italy	4–5	Portugal
18:45	Palmacci 17', 33'; Marinai 22'; Marucci 26'	Report(ru)	4', 23' Léo Martins; 5', 29' Bê Martins; 25' Madjer	Referee: Eduards Borisevics (Latvia)

=== Play-offs ===
==== Seventh place play-off ====
28 August 2016
11:30

Germany	2–8	Switzerland
Schmitt 10'; Beqiri 23'	Report(ru)	12' Spaccarotella; 13', 14' Ott; 18' Shirinzi; 19' Stankovic; 30' Wittlin; 33' Mo Jäggy; 36' Hodel

==== Fifth place play-off ====
28 August 2016
12:45

Belarus	5–2	Italy
Bryshtel 5'; Samsonov 8', 30', 35'; Bokach 33'	Report(ru)	29' Frainetti; 30' Palmacci

Referee: Antonio Joaquim Pereira Almeida (Portugal)

==== Third place play-off ====
28 August 2016
16:30

Spain	7–8	Russia
Gomez 7', 24'; Juanma 16'; Molina 17', 30'; Ardil 19'; Carrera Tracisto 22'	Report(ru)	9' Nikonorov; 9', 25' Peremitin; 12' Shkarin; 16' Makarov; 17' Shishin; 19', 28' Aksenov

Referee: Ingilab Mammadov (Azerbaijan)

==== Superfinal match ====
28 August 2016
17:45

Ukraine	2–1	Portugal
Zborovskyi 25'; Medved 26'	Report(ru)	8' Santos

Referee: Gionni Matticoli (Italy)

2016 Euro Beach Soccer League
champions

Ukraine
First title

=== Awards ===
Top scorer
(Italy) Paolo Palmacci (8 goals)
Best player
(Portugal) Bê Martins
Best goalkeeper
(Ukraine) Vitaliy Sydorenko

=== Final standings ===
Pos	Team	Notes
1	Ukraine	champions
2	Portugal	runners-up
3	Russia	Third place
4	Spain	
5	Belarus	
6	Italy	
7	Switzerland	
8	Germany	
