= Ría de Arousa =

Estuary in Galicia, Spain

Coordinates: 42°30′N 8°56′W

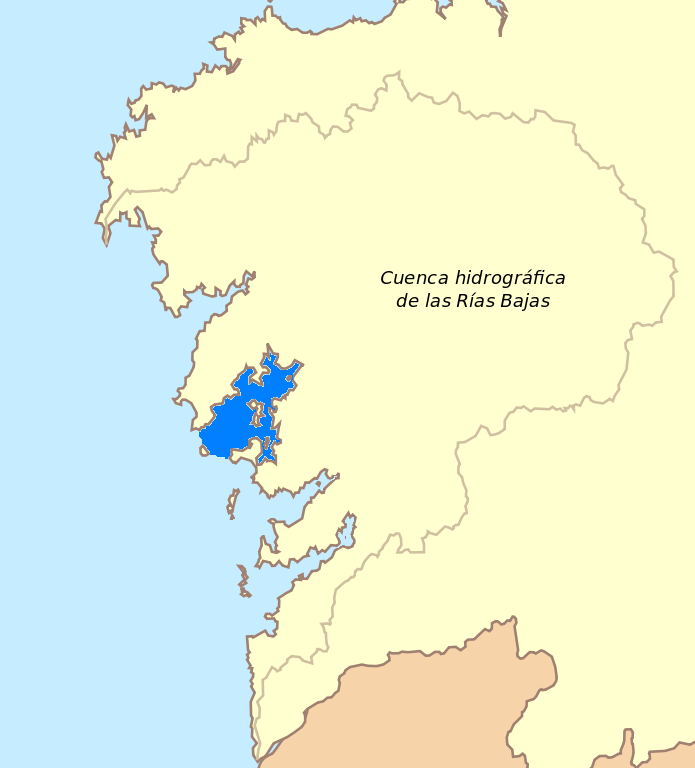
Ría de Arousa

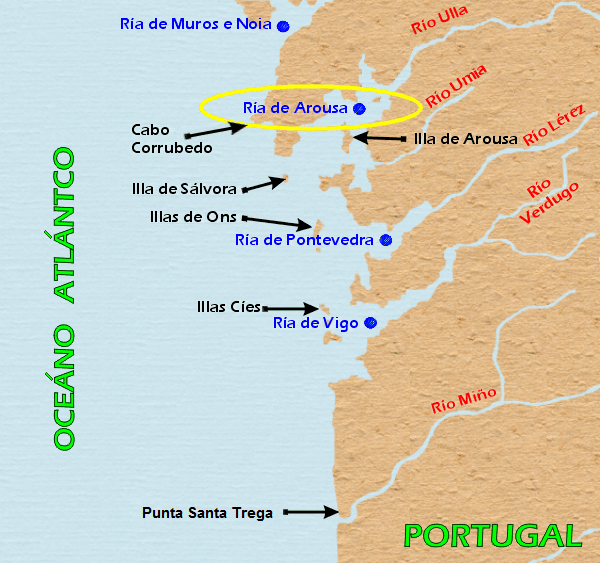
Map showing the location of the Ría de Arousa

The Ría de Arousa is a ria, a saline estuary in Galicia, Spain. It is one of the five Rías Baixas, and located between the Ría de Muros e Noia (es, gl) to the north and the Ria de Pontevedra to the south. The peninsulas of Barbanza, in the province of A Coruña, and O Salnés, in the province of Pontevedra, define the ria's coasts to the north and south respectively.

While the Ría de Arousa is the largest of the Rías Baixas, it does not reach the greatest depth, with a 69 m maximum depth at the mouth. It has numerous islands and islets among which are the islands of Arousa, A Toxa, Sálvora in the mouth and Cortegada at the entrance. The main rivers that flow into it are the Ulla River at its headwaters and the River Umia in the cove that forms the peninsula of O Grove with the coast of Cambados.

The most important river towns are Ribeira, A Pobra do Caramiñal, Rianxo and Boiro to the north, and Vilagarcía de Arousa, Vilanova de Arousa, Cambados and O Grove to the south, and Arousa on Arousa Island.

== Zones ==
The northern zone, corresponding to the province of A Coruña, is relatively steep, with the Serra da Barbanza near the coast. The beaches take a few metres depth from the shore, forming sand banks in the interior bays.

The southern zone, corresponding to the province of Pontevedra, is a flood zone, where the river Umia ends. The characteristic of the coast is shallow, with extensive formation of sand banks, where many arenicolous bivalves are grown like cockles or clams. The most well-known banks of Sarrido belong to the delta of Umia river and Os Lombos do Ulla belonging to the homonymous river delta. This southern area is relatively flat up to the highlands of Mount Castrove, which separates it from the Ría de Pontevedra, and is characterized by small farm plots usually cultivated with vegetables (Padrón peppers, tomato, lettuce and legumes) or grapevines. The grapevines in the O Salnés area is mostly white grape Salnés (varieties Albariño wine). There are also cultivated dark grapes for the production of red wine also known Barrantes. There are also pink grape cultivated with which Catalan wine is made.

== Fauna ==
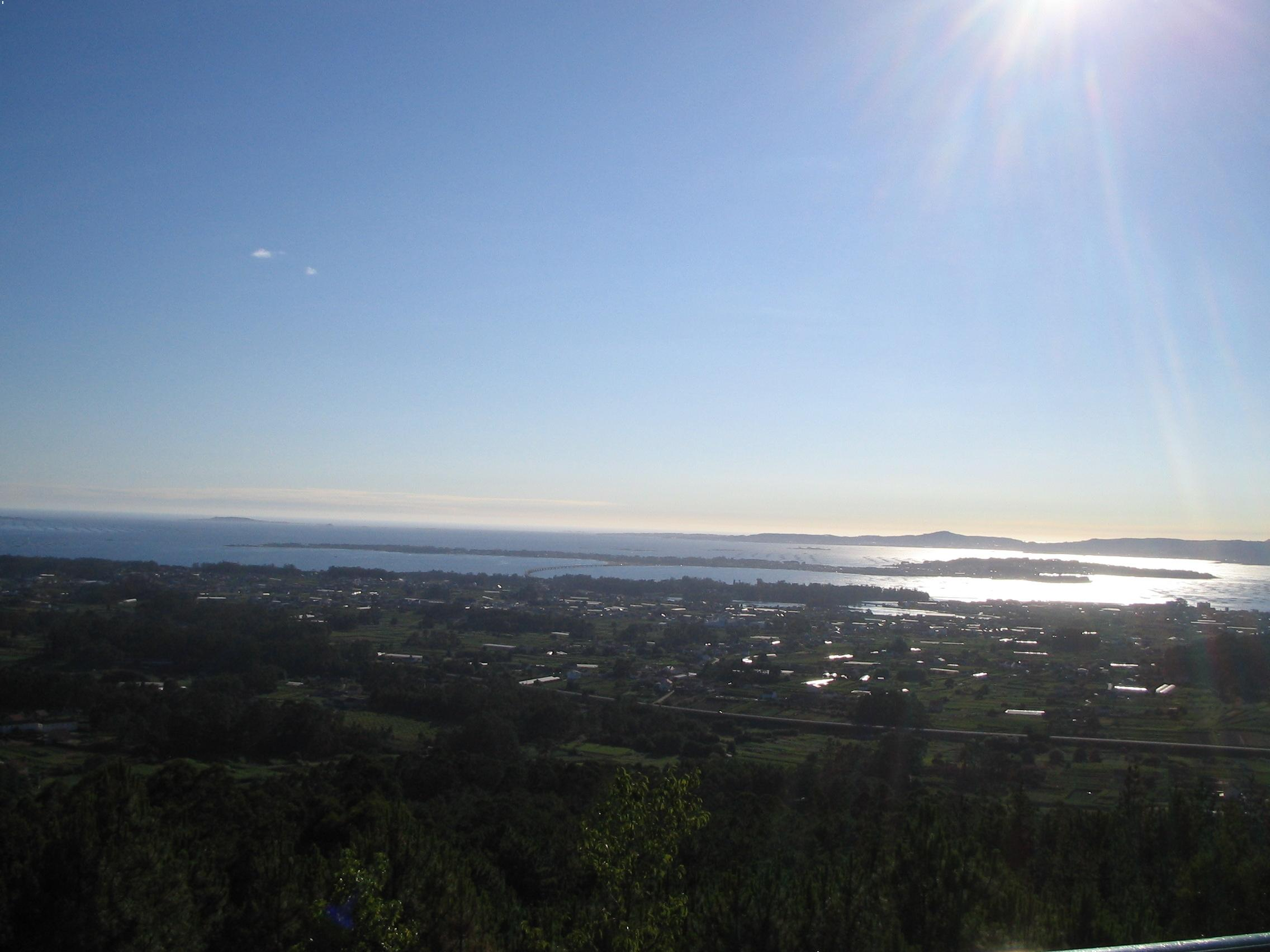
Ría de Arousa

Its physical configuration allows a high production of phytoplankton, with a characteristic ocean flow that makes this river famous for its rich marine life.

It is the area of greatest mussel production in all the world. They are grown in nurseries, cultivated in floating rafts.

Whales are starting to reappear along the coasts where once were known for whaling industries.
