= Manuel Bernárdez =

Uruguayan writer and diplomat

Manuel Bernández
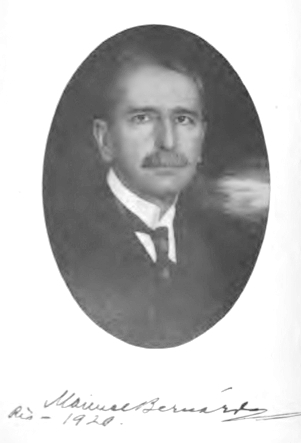
- Poet, Journalist, Diplomat
- Born: August 13, 1867; Vilagarcía de Arousa, Galicia, Spain
- Died: 1942 (aged 74–75)

Manuel Bernárdez (13 August 1867 – 1942) was a Galician-born Uruguayan diplomat, poet, journalist, and editor.

== Life and Family ==
Bernárdez was the son of Juan Ramón Bernardez and Dolores Filgueira. When he was six, they left Vilagarcía de Arousa, Galicia, to settle in Arapey, Uruguay; he became a naturalized Uruguayan when he reached the legal age.

Bernárdez was completely home-schooled by his father, having never attended school or college.

== Writings ==
In his youth, he took to prose and especially poetry, publishing his first volume (Confidencias, a una joven Amiga) when he was eighteen. For the next thirty years, he would spend his professional life mainly in the staffs of various periodicals and newspapers at home and abroad; he would also marry Carmen Martínez-Thédy during this time (in 1894), with whom he would have four children.

In 1898, he became an editor for El Diario in Buenos Aires, living there for some time; later, he made a trip to Brazil, writing a book about his journey (De Buenos Aires al Iguazú). In 1904 and 1905 respectively, he wrote two volumes on Argentina, in which he celebrated that nation's economic development: Viajes por la República Argentina, La nación en marcha, Jornadas del progreso Argentino, Hacia las cumbres.

== Diplomatic career ==
In 1910, he would become the Uruguayan Consul to Brazil, and then Minister of Uruguay in 1916. He was also the Uruguayan Ambassador to Belgium and the Netherlands during 1926.

Bernárdez died in 1942.

== List of works ==
(Aside from those mentioned before)

- Claros de luna (1886)
- Memorias de campo (1887)
- Ave, Maria!
- La muerte de Artigas (1891)
- El Tratado de la Asunción (1894)
- De Buenos Aires al Iguazú (1901)
- El Brasil, su vida su trabajo, su futuro: itinerario periodístico (1908)
- Aspectos ejemplares de la nueva Bélgica : las grandes patrias chicas : páginas de una memoria (1928)
- Política y Moneda (1931)
- Tambos y Rodeos
