= O Salnés =

Coordinates: 42°30′32″N 8°47′55″W

- Comarca
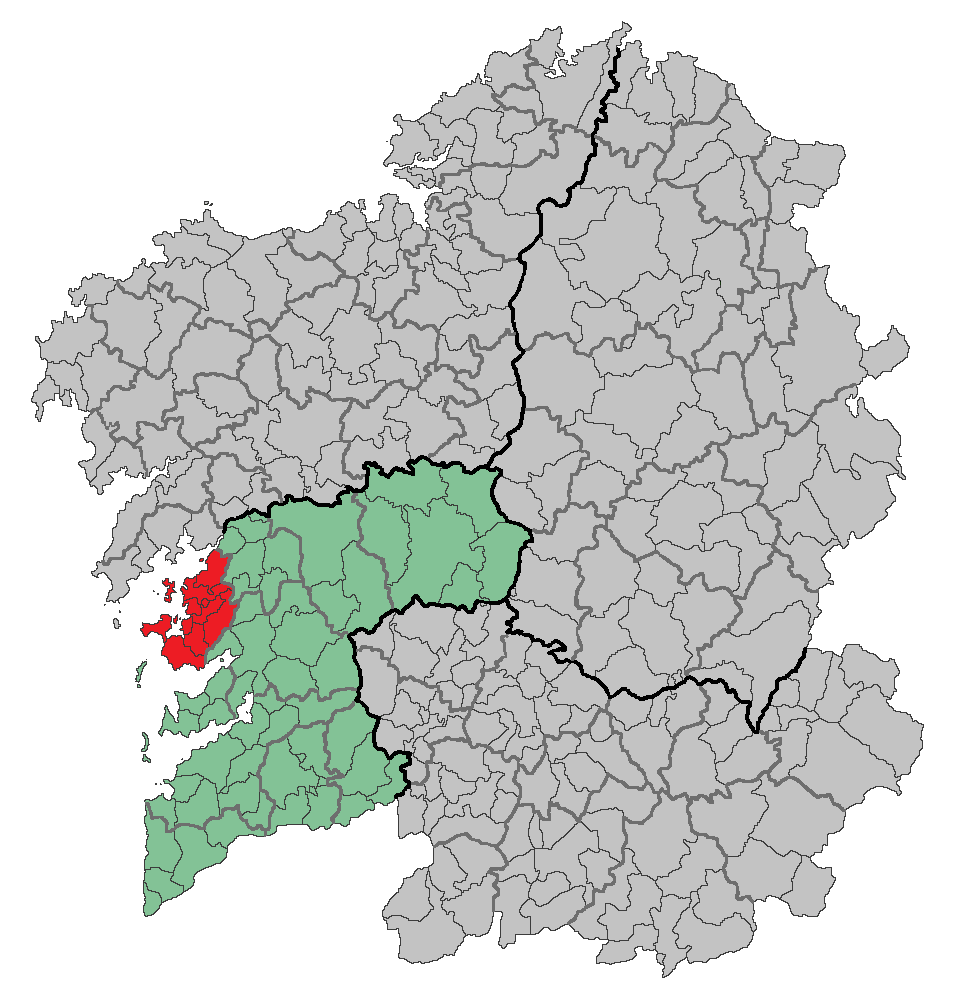
- Country: Spain
- Autonomous community: Galicia
- Province: Pontevedra
- Capital: Vilagarcía de Arousa
- Municipalities: List: A Illa de Arousa, Vilagarcía de Arousa, Vilanova de Arousa, Ribadumia, Cambados, Meaño, Meis, Pontecesures, Sanxenxo, O Grove

Area
  - Total: 275.2 km^{2} (106.3 sq mi)

Population (2018)
  - Total: 113,052
  - Density: 410.8/km^{2} (1,064/sq mi)
- Demonym(s): arousano, salnesiano
- Time zone: UTC+1 (CET)
  - Summer (DST): UTC+2 (CEST)

O Salnés is a comarca in the Galician Province of Pontevedra. It covers an area of 275.2 km^{2}, and had an overall population of 114,600 at the 2011 Census; the latest official estimate (as at the start of 2018) was 113,052.

== Municipalities ==
The comarca is composed of the following 10 municipalities:

Name of municipality	Population (2001)	Population (2011)	Population (2018)
A Illa de Arousa	4,870	4,975	4,958
Cambados	13,385	14,038	13,814
Meaño	5,426	5,451	5,315
Meis	5,017	4,939	4,776
Pontecesures	2,940	3,132	3,037
O Grove	11,039	11,265	10,700
Ribadumia	4,161	5,147	5,069
Sanxenxo	16,098	17,560	17,212
Vilagarcía de Arousa	33,496	37,493	37,819
Vilanova de Arousa	10,333	10,600	10,352
Totals	106,765	114,600	113,052
