= Festa do Albariño =

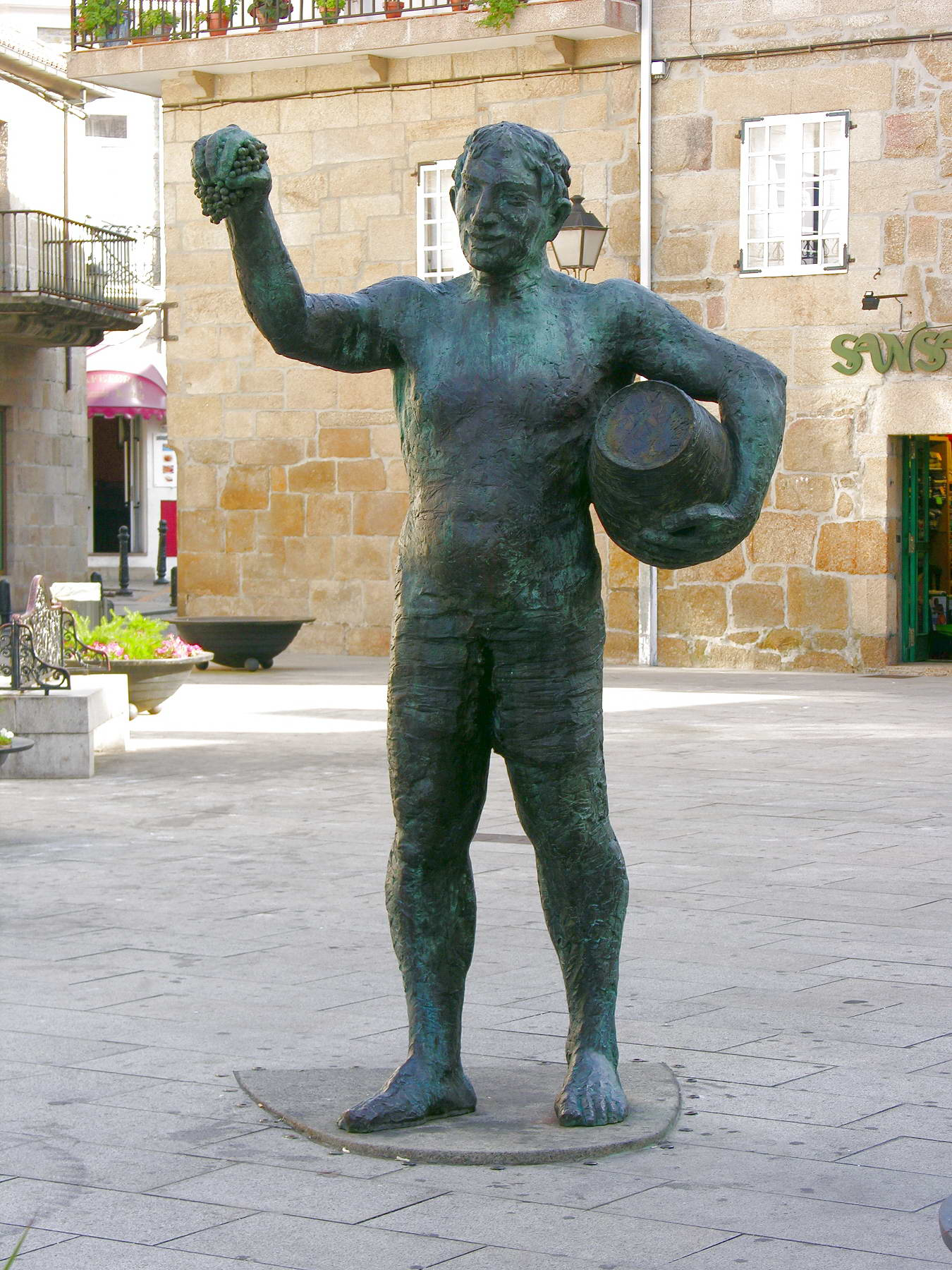
- Vendima do Albariño en Cambados
- Date: First Sunday of August
- Frequency: Annual
- Locations: Cambados (Pontevedra), Spain

Fiesta of International Tourist Interest
- Designated: 2018

The Festa do Albariño is a gastronomical feast in Cambados, Galicia, Spain celebrated during the week leading to the first Sunday of August. It is the oldest wine feast of Galicia and the second of Spain.

The origin of this feast was a challenge in 1953 between Bernardino Quintanilla and Ernesto Zárate for determining the best wine of 1952.

== The Festa ==
Nowadays, the festa is celebrated during the week leading to the first Sunday of August. It is a popular event in which both the wine Albariño and the people are the stars. Every year this party concentrates about 150.000 people. This event is one of the most important of the Galician feast calendar.

The Festa do Albariño has two faces. One of then is the public face: musical shows, fireworks, exhibitions, sport competitions, artworks, workshops about the Albariño and a collective tasting of the wine. The second face is formed by all of the official acts like the parade of the Capítulo Serenísimo do Albariño, which is held on the Sunday of the feast and goes from the Town Council Square to the Fefiñans Square.
