= Juan Norat =

Spanish footballer (1944–2021)

Personal information
- Full name: Juan Norat Pérez
- Date of birth: 6 December 1944
- Place of birth: Sanxenxo, Spain
- Date of death: 19 December 2021 (aged 77)
- Place of death: Sanxenxo, Spain
- Height: 1.77 m (5 ft 10 in)
- Position: Midfielder

Senior career*
| Years | Team | Apps | (Gls) |
| 1964–1970 | Pontevedra | 37 | (1) |
| 1970–1971 | Ourense | | |
| 1971–1979 | Pontevedra | 167+ | (5+) |
- * Club domestic league appearances and goals

Juan Norat Pérez (6 December 1944 – 19 December 2021) was a Spanish professional footballer who played as a midfielder.

== Career ==
Born in Sanxenxo, Norat spent almost his entire career with local club Pontevedra across four levels (in the Primera División, Segunda División, Segunda División B and Tercera División) between 1964 and 1979. His time at Pontevedra was interrupted by a one-season stint at Ourense in the 1970–71 season.

== Later life and death ==
Norat died in Sanxenxo on 19 December 2021, at the age of 77.
