= Cambados =

- Municipality
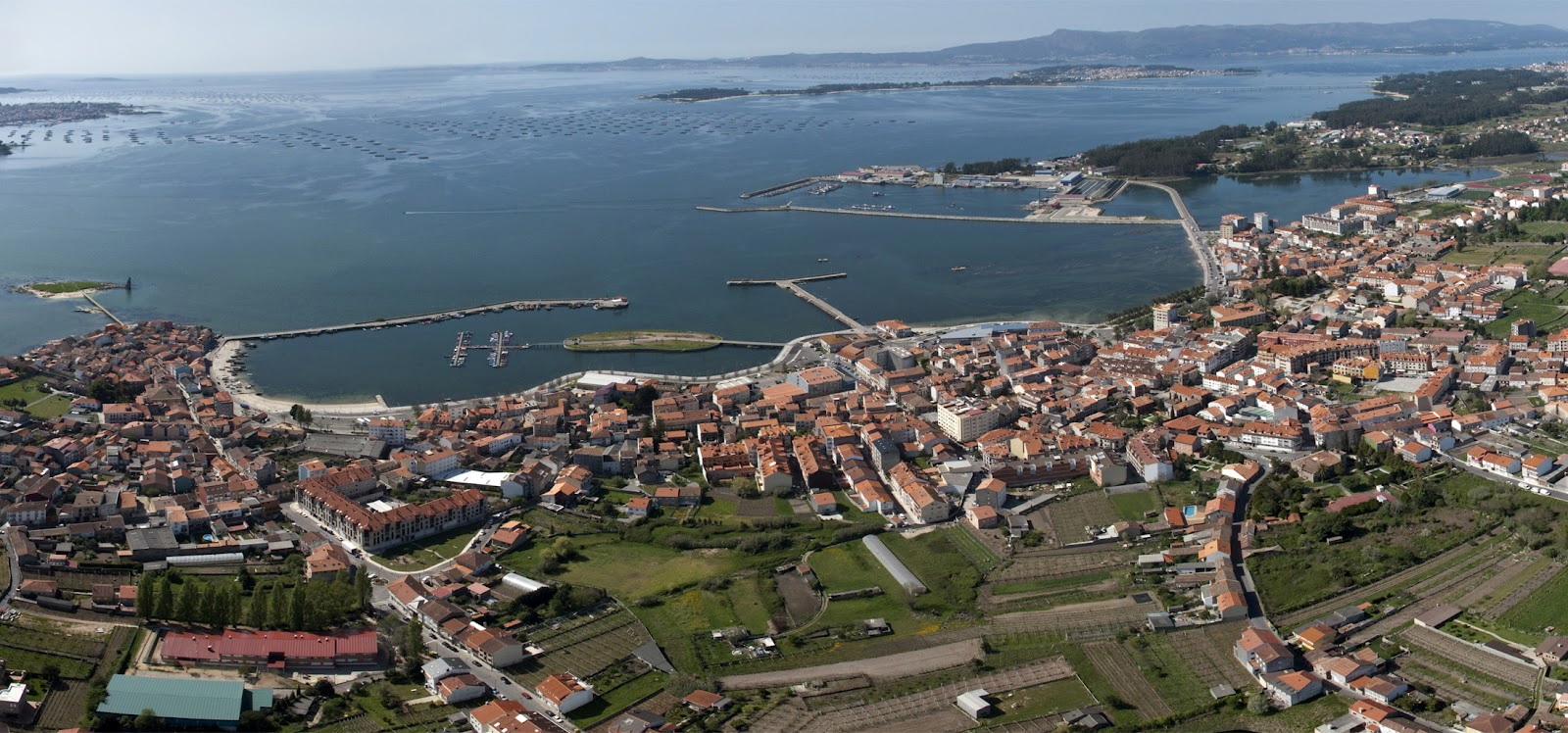

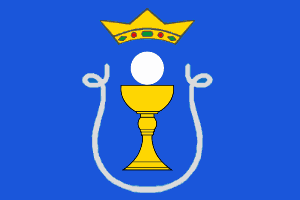
- Flag Coat of arms

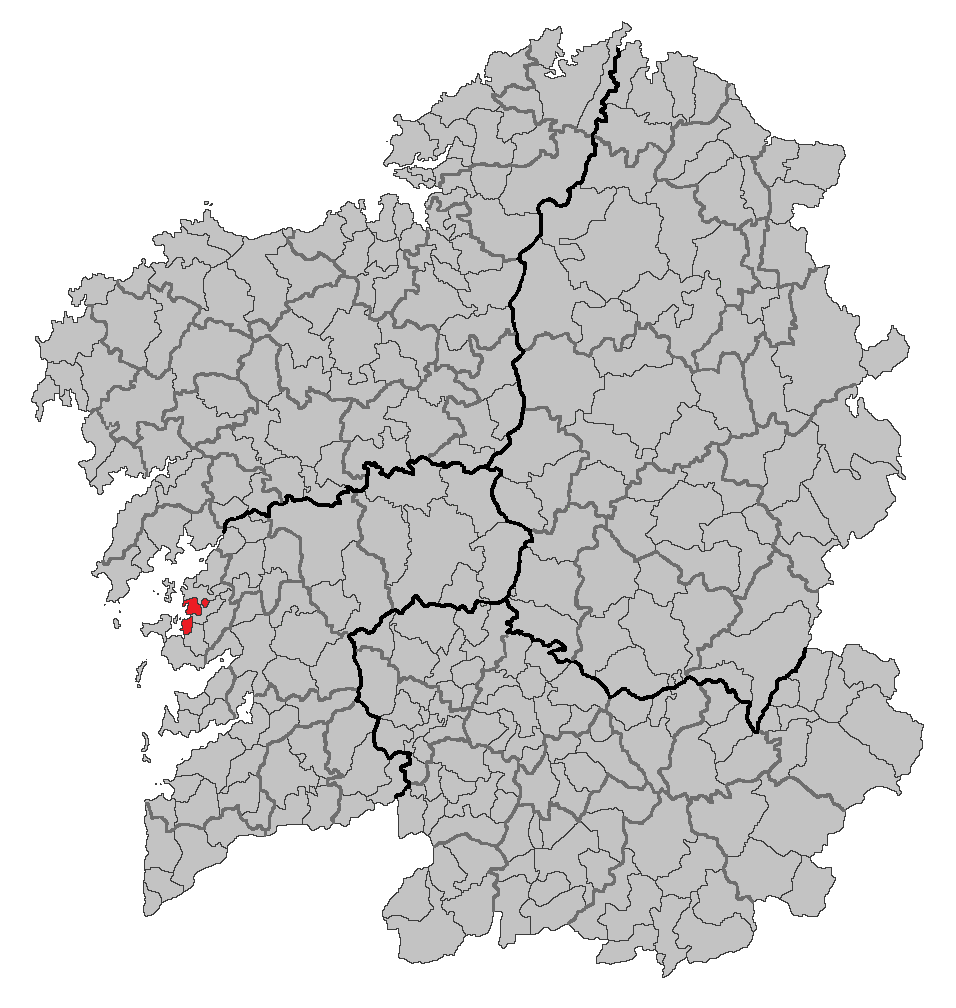
- Location of Cambados within Galicia
- Coordinates: 42°30′53″N 8°48′49″W
- Country: Spain
- Autonomous community: Galicia
- Province: Pontevedra
- County: O Salnés
- Parishes: Cambados, Castrelo, Corbillón, Oubiña, Vilariño

Government
  - Type: Ayuntamiento
  - Body: Concello de Cambados
  - Mayor: Samuel Lago Ozón (PSdeG-PSOE)

Area
  - Total: 23.48 km^{2} (9.07 sq mi)

Population (2025-01-01)
  - Total: 13,863
  - Rank: 40th in Galicia; 19th in Pontevedra
- Demonym(s): cambadés (m), cambadesa (f)
- Time zone: UTC+1 (CET)
  - Summer (DST): UTC+2 (CET)
- Website: www.cambados.es

Cambados is a town and municipality in Galicia, Spain in the province of Pontevedra. It is known for its historical monuments, its seafood and the famous white wine, Albariño. The town is a Site of Cultural Interest, declared in 2001, and was named European City of Wine in 2017.

Cambados

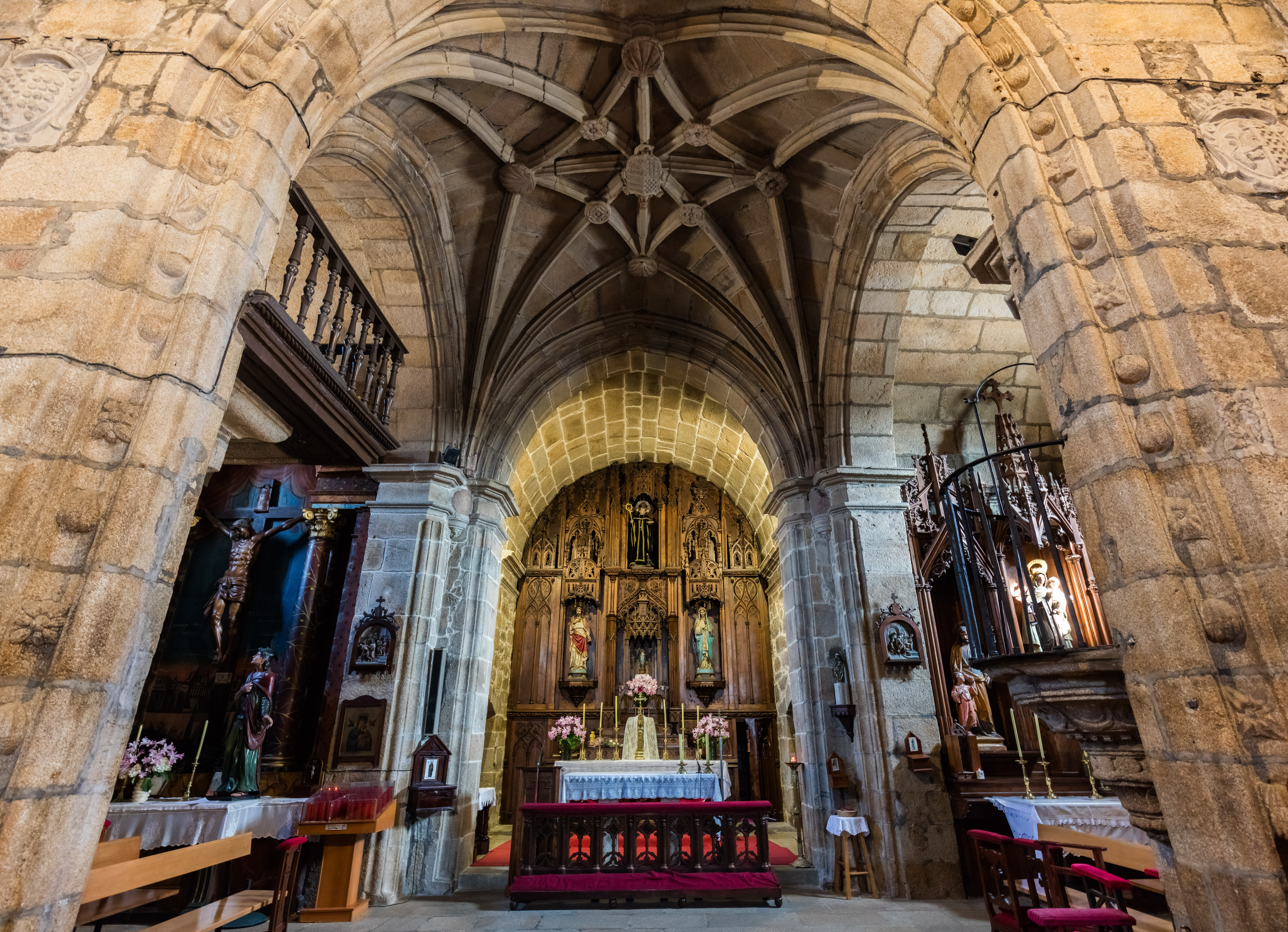
Interior of the church of St Benito.

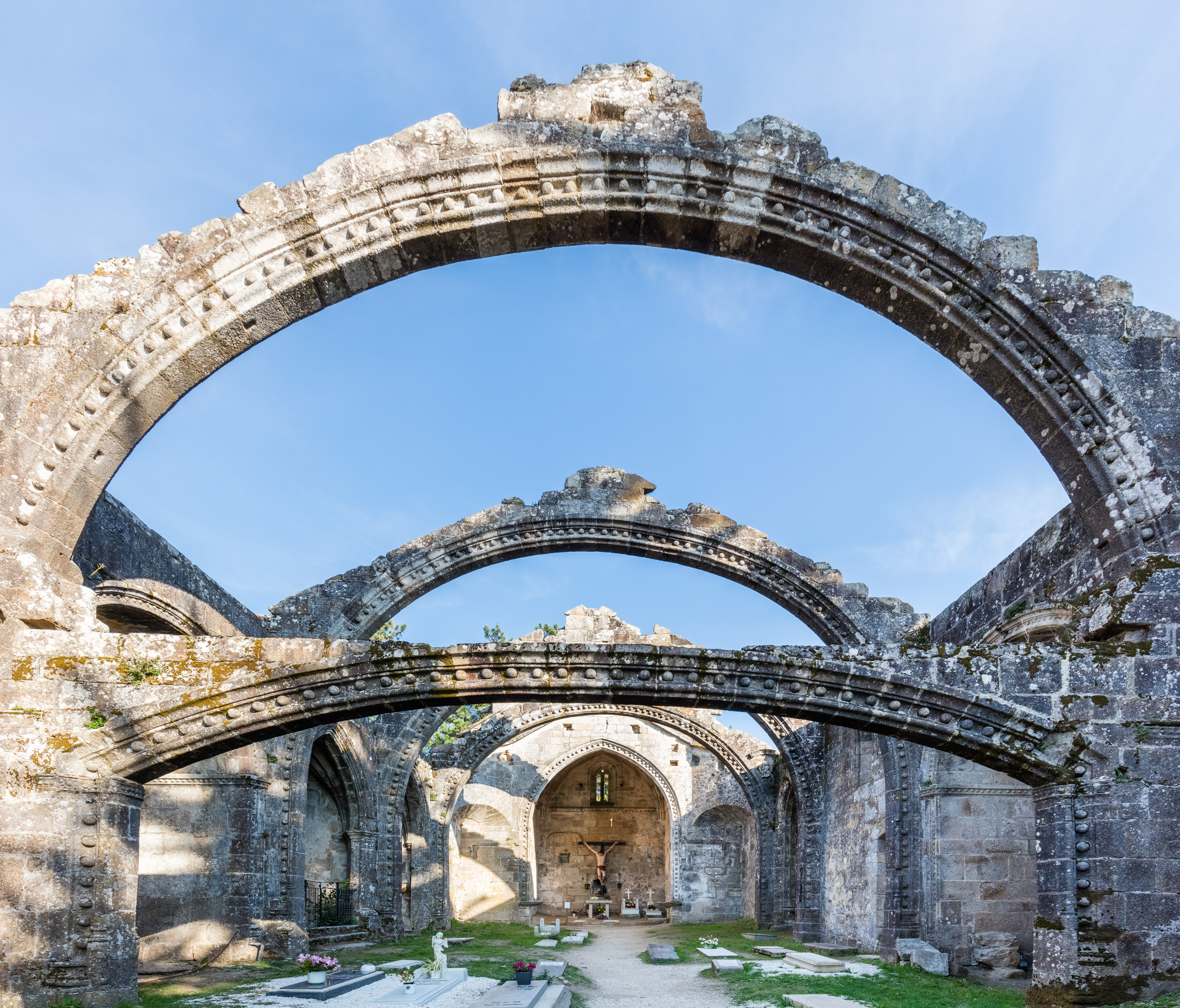
Ruins of the church of St Mariña Dozo.

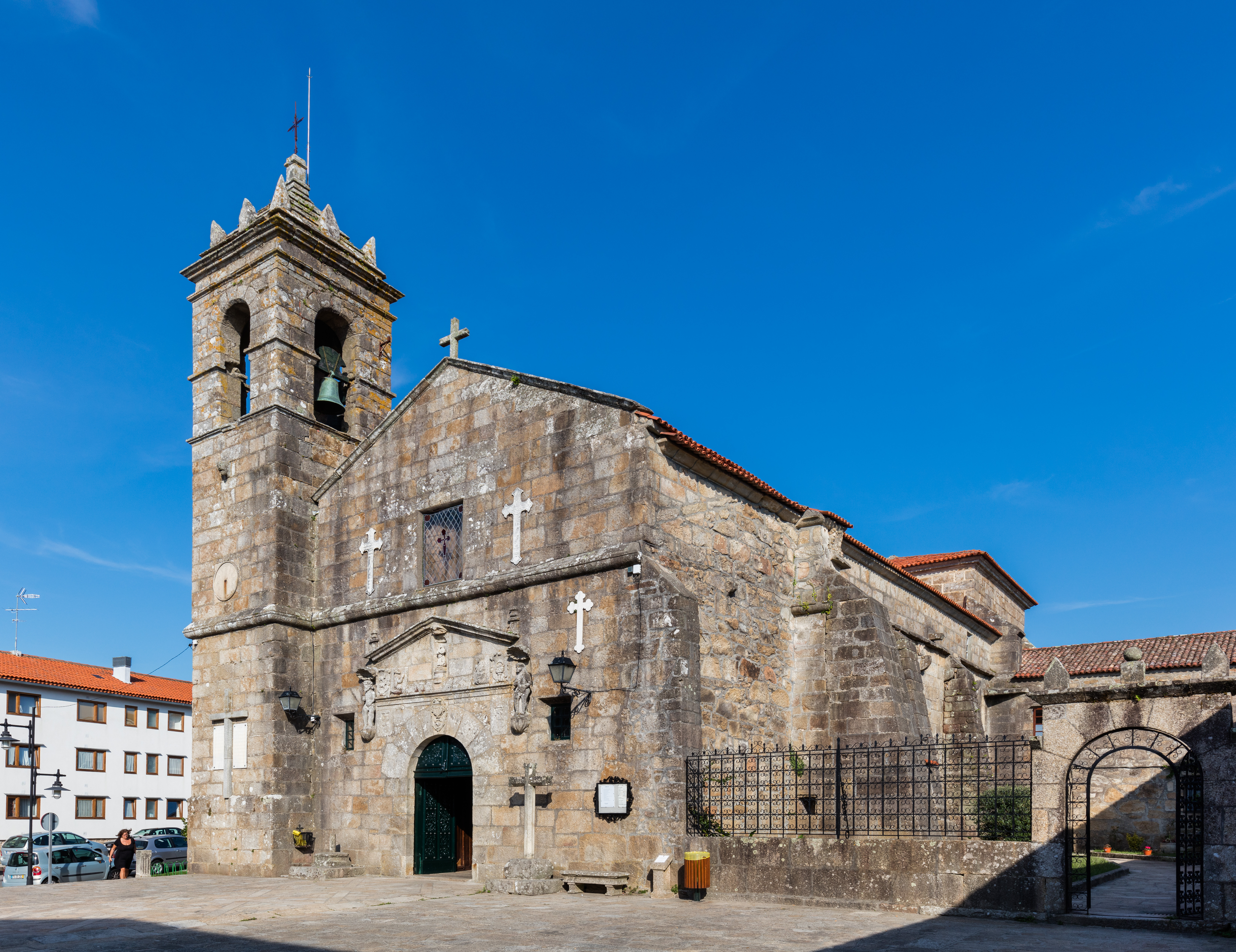
Convent of San Francisco in Cambados.

== Culture ==
Fishing is a major industry in this coastal area of Galicia (called Rias Baixas). In Cambados, fish and seafood sellers sell at the Lonja de Cambados (Cambados Fish Market). Fish is a common part of the daily diet in this region. La ría de Arousa, the body of water that surrounds this area, is rich in many types of seafood as well.

In Cambados, seafood is mostly collected in "O Serrido" or "A Seca", which is an area of water surrounding the San Tome Tower (see below) that empties of water during low tide, leaving the perfect area for seafood collectors. Large groups of them, (mostly women, with few exceptions) go when the tide is low with their buckets and tools to dig up the sand and collect seafood (clams, cockles, etc.). The culture in Cambados, as well as most coastal villages of Galicia, very much revolves around seafood. It is always eaten at Christmas time, on holidays, and (especially) at weddings.

Every Saturday and Wednesday morning there is a market along the maritime walk, selling generally cheap clothing, accessories, shoes, perfumes, and household items. It is very popular because of its prices and walking through the market the sellers yell out prices and persuasions.

Most holidays call for fiestas, in which there are performances and rides, usually occurring during summertime. The largest and most famous of these fiestas is the Festa do Albariño which is celebrated during the week leading to the first Sunday of August. Tents are set up along the Calzada selling high quality Albariño wine and seafood, and most people walk around with a wine glass hanging with a thread from their neck. Performances during the Albariño are usually special: whilst other fiesta performances consist of unknown orchestras, the Albariño usually brings about more famous performers. For example, Alejandro Sanz has performed during these fiestas.

== Albariño ==
Cambados is famous for its Albariño white wine. The area is generally moist, cool and windy, contributing to the grape's thickness and the wine's strong aroma. It has only been within this last decade that Albariño has become world-renowned and has been grown outside of Galicia. This wine has been nicknamed “the wine of the sea”, because of its coastal vineyards and its compatibility with seafood (caused by its acidity).

== Political History ==
The first mayor of Cambados during the Second Republic of Spain was Juan Vidal Fraga (1931–1936). The republic reached Cambados without the existence of a republican party in the area. Fraga's family had controlled the political life in Cambados during the reform. In February 1936, José Manuel Silva became the new governor. The beginning of the 20th century coincides with Spain's restoration period, which is politically influenced by Cánovas del Castillo. This consists in the alternation of power between two parties—the Conservative and Liberal (leaving out, for now, the Obreira and Republican parties). This contributed with major political change, leaning towards a local system rather than being associated with Spain's higher power. The first democratic elections were in 1979.

== Climate ==
This climate can be classified as hot and oceanic humid. Temperatures are moderate and rainfall is abundant, 1,500 millimeters on average. In the winter maximum temperatures hover around 14 °C and minimum around −2 °C, but rarely drop below 0 °C. In the spring and fall the minimum is around 6 °C and maximum around 23 °C. Storms and heavy rains are common around this time of the year. In the summer the minimum temperatures at night drop to between 16 °C and 18 °C and in the day temperatures reach 30 °C, there are internal record temperatures of 35 °C. Rainfall during the months of summer are insignificant.

== Population ==
Historical population

Year	Pop.	±%
1877	5,036	—
1887	5,460	+8.4%
1900	6,097	+11.7%
1910	7,109	+16.6%
1920	7,734	+8.8%
1930	7,725	−0.1%
1940	8,450	+9.4%

Year	Pop.	±%
1950	9,686	+14.6%
1960	10,034	+3.6%
1970	11,112	+10.7%
1980	13,109	+18.0%
1990	12,668	−3.4%
2000	13,385	+5.7%
2010	14,038	+4.9%

Source: From: INE Archiv

== Monuments of interest ==
- Pazo of Fefiñáns
- Church of San Bieito
- Ruins of the Church of Santa Mariña
- Tower of`San Sadurniño
- Pazo of Montesacro
- A Seca mill (Muíño da Seca) (tidal mill)
- Monument of Ramón Cabanillas (Poet)
- Monument of Baco in the praza de Ramón Cabanillas
- Monument das Vieiras
- Pazo da Capitana

== Civil parishes ==
- Cambados (Santa Mariña)
- Castrelo (Santa Cruz)
- Corbillón (San Abraham)
- Oubiña (San Vicenzo)
- Vilariño (San Adrián or San Quirico).

== Natural areas ==
- River mouth of ría Umia
- Monte Rei
- Santa Mariña Dozo
- Viewpoint of 'A Pastora'
- And Monte Castro or "Con de Sete Pious" (95 m.)
- O saco de Fefiñáns
- A illa da Torre
- Xunqueira do Pombal

== Famous persons ==
- Ramón Cabanillas (writer)
- Francisco Asorey (sculptor)
- Manolo Paz (sculptor)
- Yayo Daporta (chef)
- Domingo Tabuyo Romero (poet and politician)
- Sito Miñanco (smuggler and drug trafficker)

== See also ==
- List of municipalities in Pontevedra
