= Meaño =

- Municipality
- Flag Coat of arms

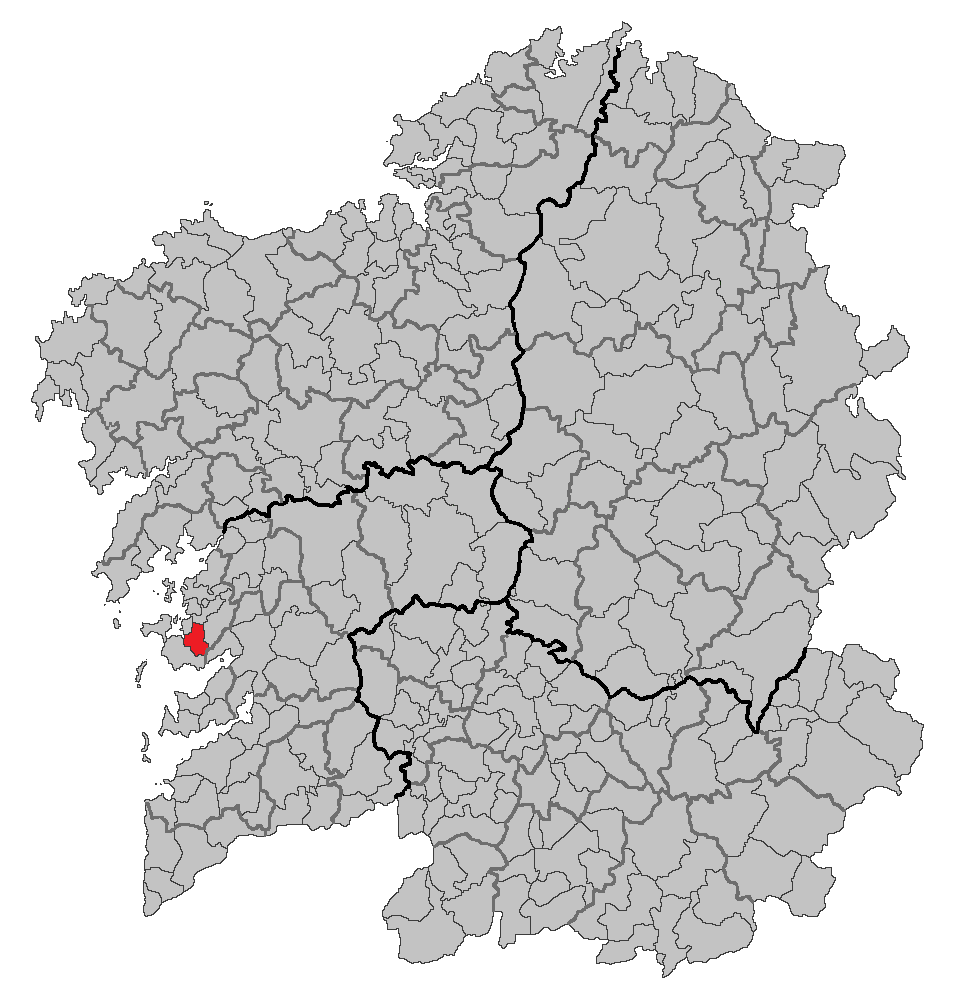
- Situation of Meaño within Galicia

- Location within Spain Location within Galicia
- Coordinates: 42°27′N 8°47′W
- Country: Spain
- Autonomous community: Galicia
- Province: Pontevedra
- Comarca: O Salnés

Government
  - Alcalde (Mayor): Carlos Viéitez Fernández (People's Party)

Area
  - Total: 27.77 km^{2} (10.72 sq mi)

Population (2024)
  - Total: 5,258
  - Density: 189.3/km^{2} (490.4/sq mi)
- Demonym(s): Meañés, -a
- Time zone: UTC+1 (CET)
  - Summer (DST): UTC+2 (CET)

Meaño is a municipality in the province of Pontevedra, in the autonomous community of Galicia, Spain. It belongs to the comarca of O Salnés. Situated in the Rías Baixas, a local specialty of the region is its Albariño wine.

== Landmarks ==
The Pazo de los Zárate and the baroque Pazo de Lis, alongside churches like San Miguel de Lores and Santa María de Simes, are civil and religious architecture present in the region

== Local Festivities ==
San Amaro in January and Santa Eulalia in December and, hosting the Encontro Albariño de Autor festival in July.

== See also ==
- List of municipalities in Pontevedra
