= O Grove =

Concello do Grove
- Municipality
- Seal

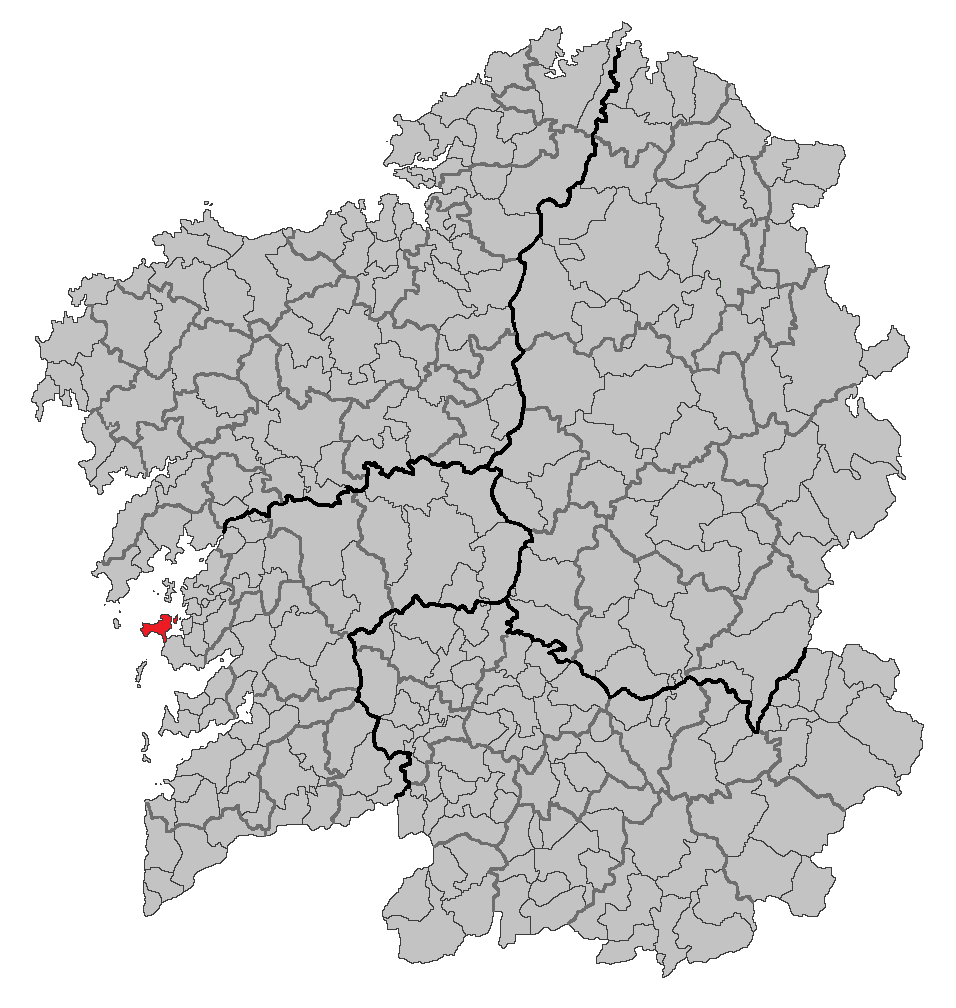
- Location of O Grove within Galicia
- Coordinates: 42°29′38″N 8°51′54″W
- Parroquias: San Martín, San Vicente

Population (2025-01-01)
  - Total: 10,877
- Time zone: UTC+1 (CET)
  - Summer (DST): UTC+2 (CET)

O Grove (alternative spelling: Ogrobe), in spanish El Grove, is a municipality belonging to the province of Pontevedra, in Galicia, Spain.

A peninsula that faces the Atlantic Ocean and the shores of O Salnés valley, enclosed by the southern Galician estuaries, the Rías Baixas.

== Etymology ==
The name Ogrobe is well documented and the following passage in Latin was written about the name of Ograbe: "et ecclesiam Sancti Uincentii in insula Ocobre dextris cum suis." (899, St. Vincent of O Grove). Its original form is Ogrobe, having suffered in more recent times as a result of a completely Galician etymological process. As natural etymological evolution occurred, the segmentation of the initial vowel "O" was confused with the masculine singular article in Galician and is translated as "El" in Spanish.

== Geography ==
It is a small peninsula joined to the mainland by an isthmus known as O Vao, leading to the A Lanzada beach to the west and the wide intertidal marsh complex Umia-O Grove to the east, which connects with the town of Sanxenxo. Likewise, in O Grove is the small island of A Toxa which is accessed by a bridge from the early twentieth century.

== Demography ==
From:INE Archiv

== Tourism ==
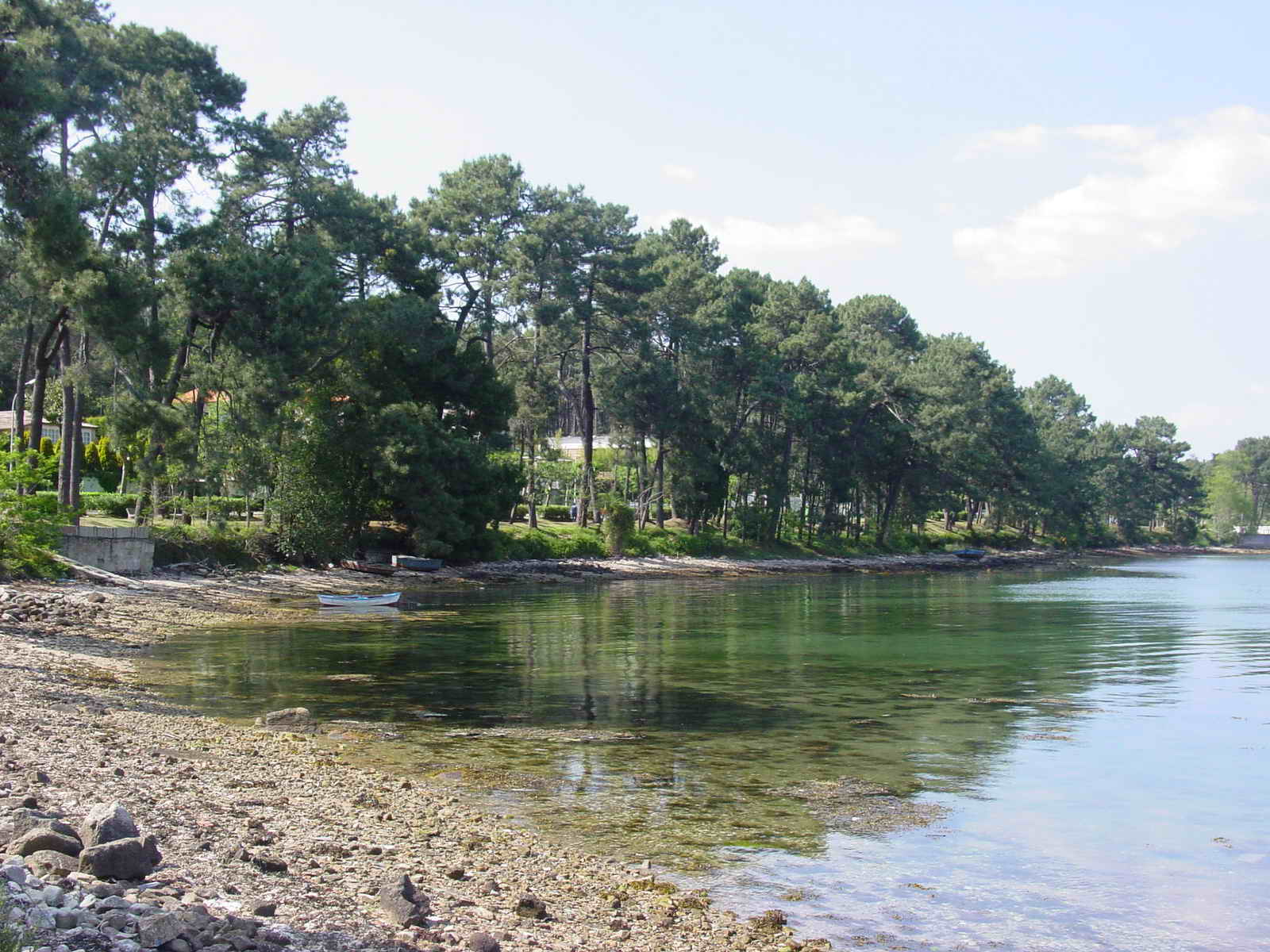
Island of A Toxa

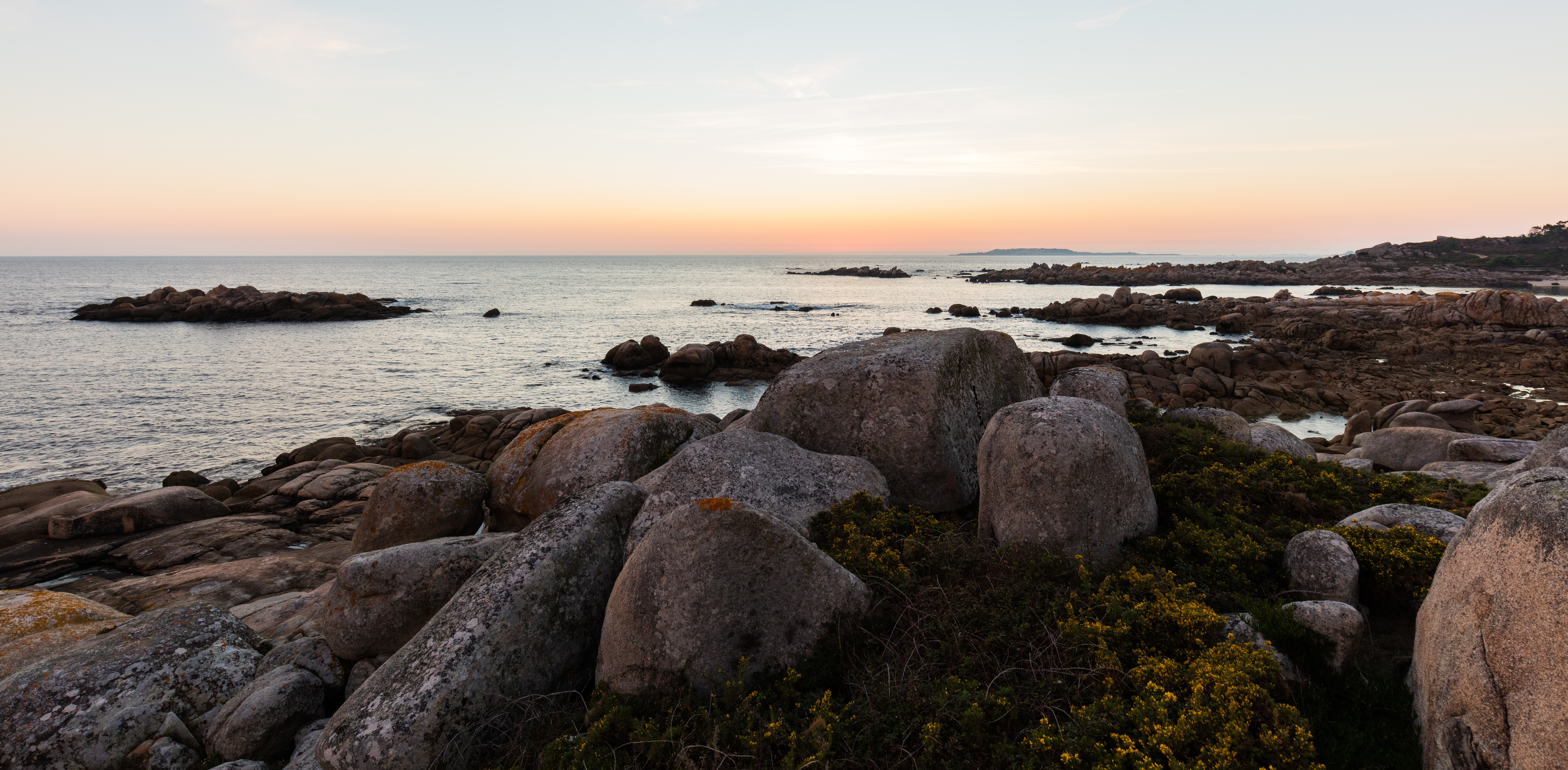
Sunset in the popular coast of San Vicente, O Grove.

O Grove is a town of excellent tourism, with many hotels and campsites.

In the parish of San Vicente do Grove, one finds the beaches in this municipality. This is where the tourist zone of San Vicente do Mar and Pedras Negras is found, which, along with the marina and promenade, make this spot a favorite place for bathers.

== See also ==
- List of municipalities in Pontevedra
