= Vilanova de Arousa =

Coordinates: 42.56285°N 8.82782°W

- municipality
- Coat of arms

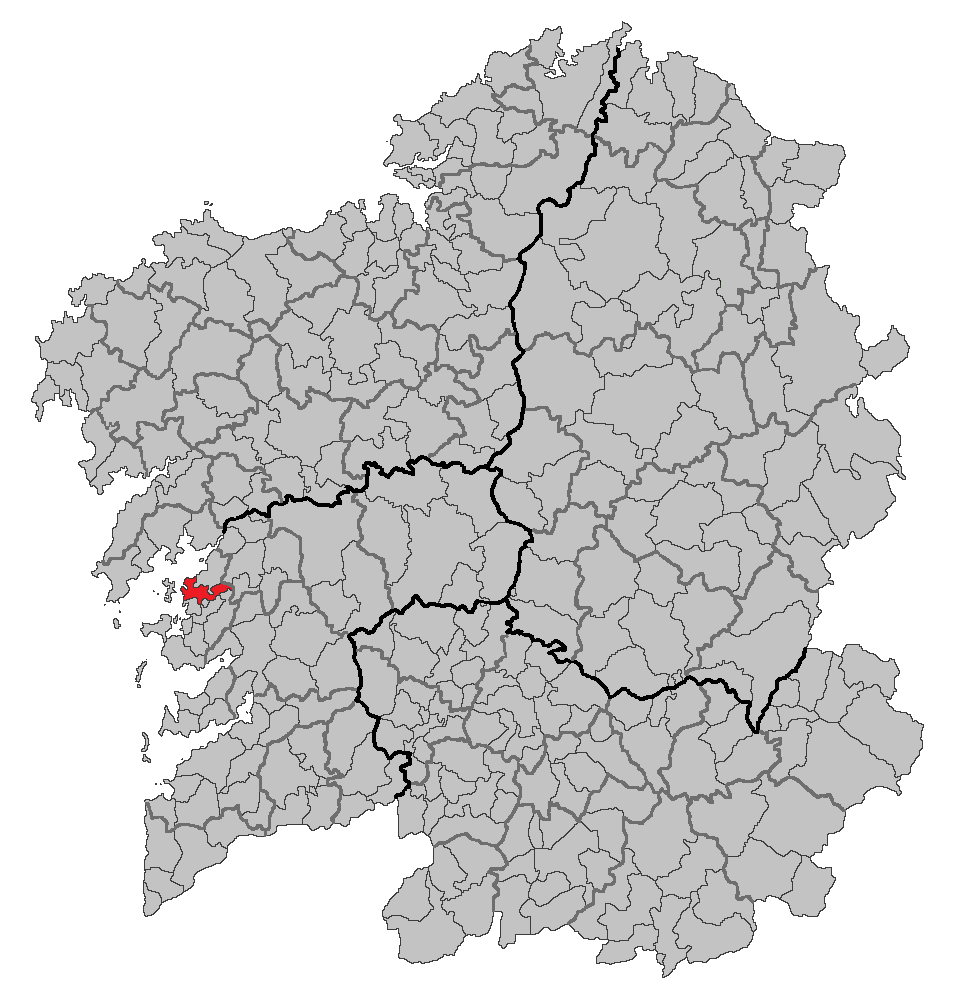
- Situation of Vilanova de Arousa within Galicia
- Parroquias: ?

Government
  - Alcalde (Mayor): Gonzalo Durán Hermida (PPdeG)

Population (2025-01-01)
  - Total: 10,182
- Time zone: UTC+1 (CET)
  - Summer (DST): UTC+2 (CET)

Vilanova de Arousa (Galician: [ˌbilɐˈnɔβɐ ð(e) aˈɾowsɐ]; unofficial Spanish: Villanueva de Arosa) is a municipality in the province of Pontevedra, in the autonomous community of Galicia, Spain. It belongs to the comarca of O Salnés.

== See also ==
- List of municipalities in Pontevedra
