= Cinna =

Cinna may refer to:

- Cornelii Cinnae, an ancient Roman family

- Lucius Cornelius Cinna, Roman consul four consecutive times in the 80s BC and at the time of his death the father-in-law of Julius Caesar
- Gnaeus Cornelius Cinna Magnus, a conspirator against the emperor Augustus, and the subject of Corneille's tragedy Cinna

- Cinna (Galatia), a town of ancient Galatia, now in Turkey
- Cinna (plant), a genus of grasses
- Cinna (play), a tragedy by Pierre Corneille
- Cinna, character in The Hunger Games trilogy
- German Shepherd, a variation of which is called Cinna
- Cinna (horse)
- Helvius Cinna, a Roman poet
- Cinna (album), an EDM mixtape by Cannelle
