= Canela =

Canela may refer to:

== Places ==
- Canela, Rio Grande do Sul, a town in Brazil
- Canela, Chile, a commune in Chile
- La Canela, a legendary location in South America
- Isla Canela, an island in Andalusia, Spain

== Other uses ==
- Canela (surname), including a list of people with the name
- Canela Cox (born 1984), American singer and songwriter who recorded under the mononym "Canela"
- Canela, the debut album by Canela Cox
- "Canela", song by Fey, from El Color de los Sueños
- Canela, character in the 2002 Venezuelan telenovela Mambo y canela
- Canela people, an indigenous people of Brazil
- Canela language, a Ge language of Brazil
- Canela (Mexico City Metrobús), a BRT station in Mexico City

== See also ==
- Canella, a genus of plant
- Canella, earlier English name for cinnamon
- Canelas (disambiguation)
- Cannelle (disambiguation)
- Kanela
