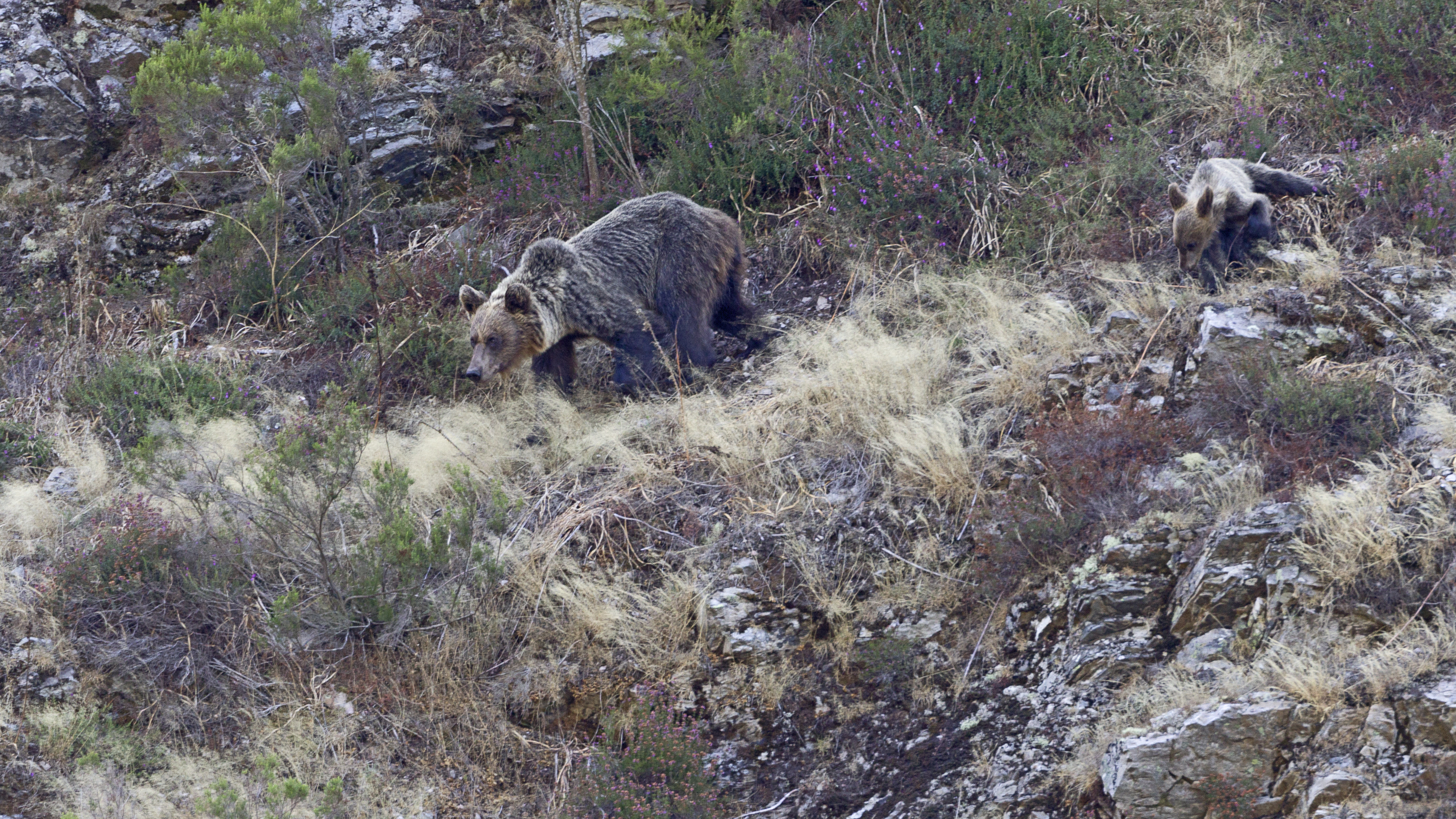
- Female bear with cub at Muniellos Nature Reserve, Asturias, Spain

Conservation status
- Endangered (IUCN 3.1)

Scientific classification
- Kingdom: Animalia
- Phylum: Chordata
- Class: Mammalia
- Order: Carnivora
- Family: Ursidae
- Genus: Ursus
- Species: U. arctos
- Subspecies: U. a. arctos
- Population: Cantabrian brown bear

Synonyms
- Ursus arctos pyrenaicus

= Cantabrian brown bear =

Population of brown bear

The Cantabrian brown bear, Iberian brown bear, or Iberian bear (formerly Ursus arctos pyrenaicus) is a population of Eurasian brown bears (Ursus arctos arctos) living in the Cantabrian Mountains of Spain.

In Spain, it is known as the oso pardo cantábrico and, more locally, in Asturias as osu. It is timid and will avoid human contact whenever possible. The Cantabrian brown bear can live for around 25–30 years in the wild.

The bear measures between 1.6 and 2 m (5.2 and 6.6 ft) in length, and between 0.90 and 1 m (3.0 and 3.3 ft) at shoulder height. On average, females weigh 85 kg (187 lb), but can reach a weight of 150 kg (330 lb). Males average 115 kg (254 lb), though they can weigh as much as 200 kg (440 lb).

== Evolution ==
Believed to have originated in Asia, the brown bear (Ursus arctos, L. 1758) spread across the Northern Hemisphere, colonising much of the Eurasian land mass as well as North America.

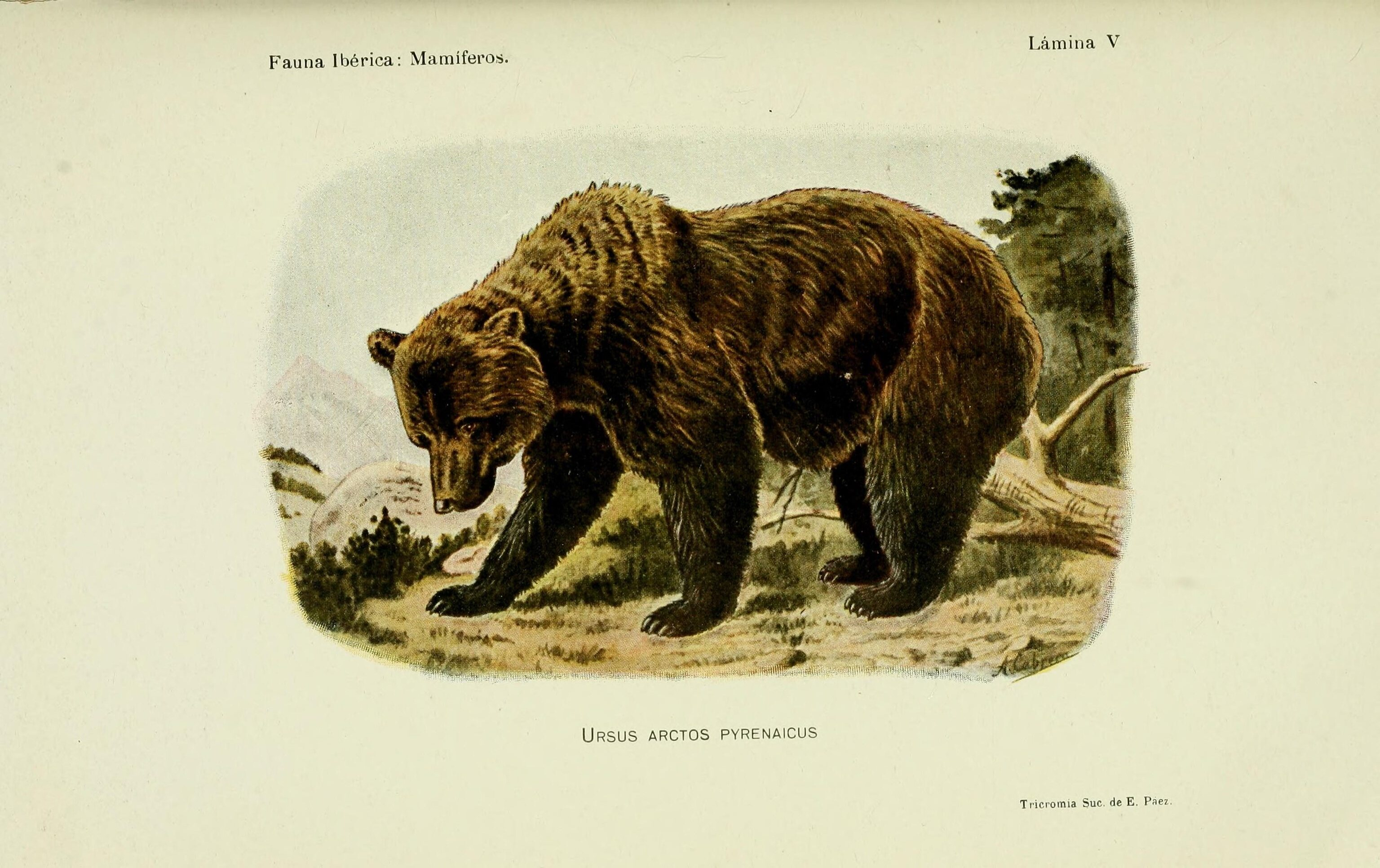
A 1914 lithography of a Cantabrian brown bear, Museo Nacional de Ciencias Naturales

Experts on bears are continuing debate on the scientific classification of bears, of which there are currently eight recognised species although some experts recognise more subspecies. In the early 20th century, Cabrera (1914) considered the Cantabrian brown bear to be a distinct subspecies of European brown bear (U. a. arctos; in itself a classification currently under debate) and named it Ursus arctos pyrenaicus (Fischer, 1829), characterised by the yellow colouring of the points of its hair and by its black paws.

Since then, however, phylogenetic and mitochondrial DNA research has led to the general scientific consensus that the European brown bear is not a separate subspecies. These recent studies have also found that the European populations fall into two major genetic lineages; an eastern type and a western type.

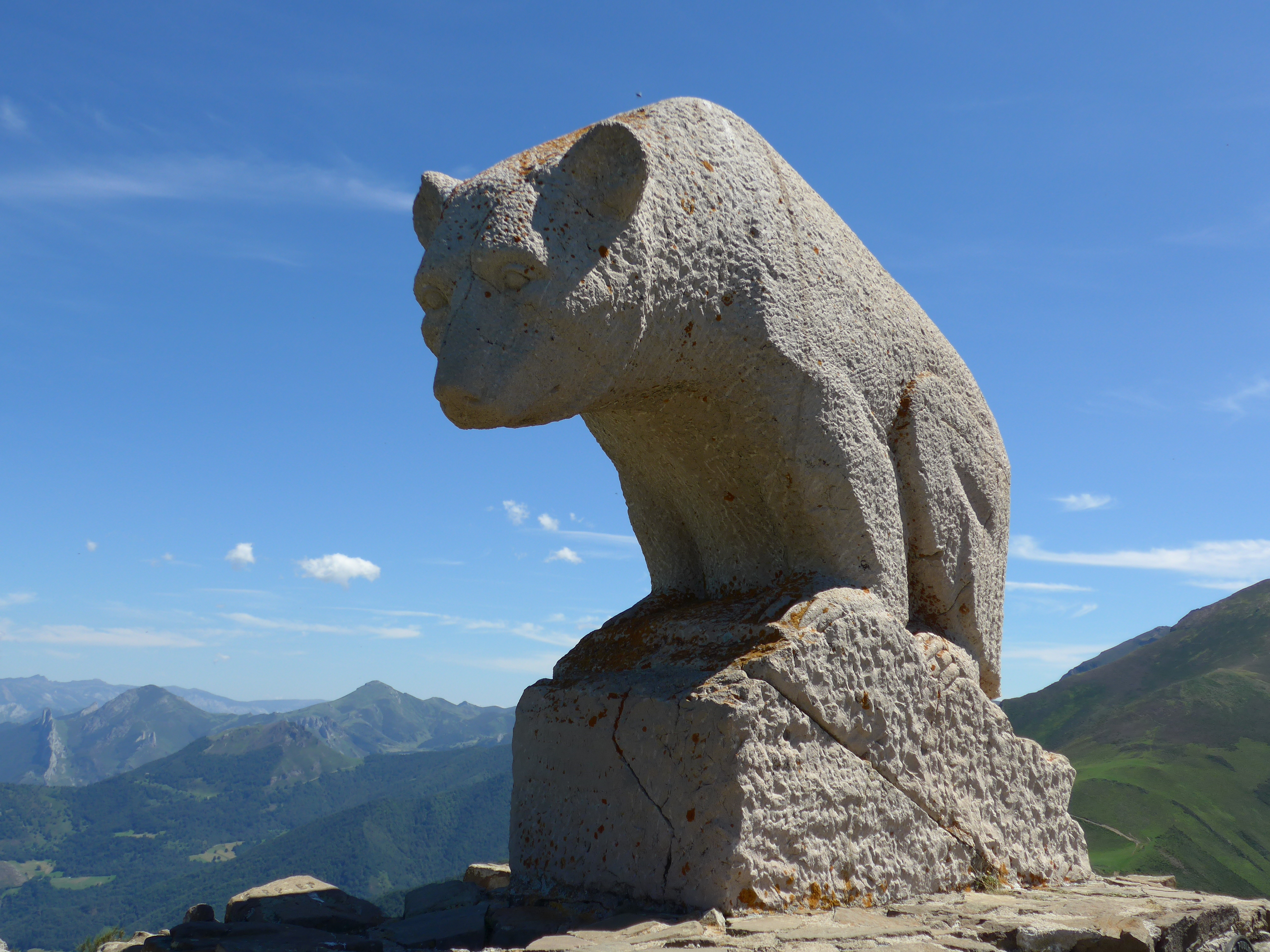
Monument to the Cantabrian brown bear at Vega de Liébana

The Cantabrian brown bear forms a part of the western type, the effective barriers of the Pleistocene ice sheets of the Alps and the Balkans having directed the spread of the brown bear respectively, north and eastwards and south and westwards. A further distinction of the two clades has been made within the western lineage following post-glacial recolonisation after the Last Glacial Maximum (LGM); one consisting of the bear populations of Southern Scandinavia, the Pyrenees and Cantabrian Mountains of Northern Spain and the other consisting of the bear populations of the Southern Alps, the Apennines, the Dinaric Alps, the Rila Mountains, the Rhodope Mountains and the Stara Planina Mountains. This leaves the remnant population of brown bears in the south of Sweden as the nearest relatives of the Cantabrian brown bear. The last indigenous, reproductive female in the Pyrenees, Canelle, was shot by a hunter in 2004. Brown bears from Slovenia are now being introduced to the Pyrenees.

== Geographic distribution ==
Having once roamed most of the Iberian Peninsula, since the first half of the 20th century the Cantabrian brown bear has been reduced to two isolated populations in the Cantabrian Mountains of Northern Spain, primarily through human persecution (direct hunting) and by loss of habitat due to agriculture and construction. These two populations occupy a combined territory total of 5,000–7,000 km^{2} covering the provinces of, in the West, Asturias, León and Lugo (Galicia) and, in the east, Palencia, León, Cantabria and Asturias. Population figures from 2007 gave 100–110 bears in the western enclave and 20–30 in the eastern, a situation which put the smaller population at risk from in-breeding. The two populations are separated by some 30–40 km, a rupture which has been interpreted as the consequence of human pressure such as the development of communication infrastructures. However, in 2008 genetic evidence was obtained from Redes Natural Park indicating recent interbreeding between the two populations.

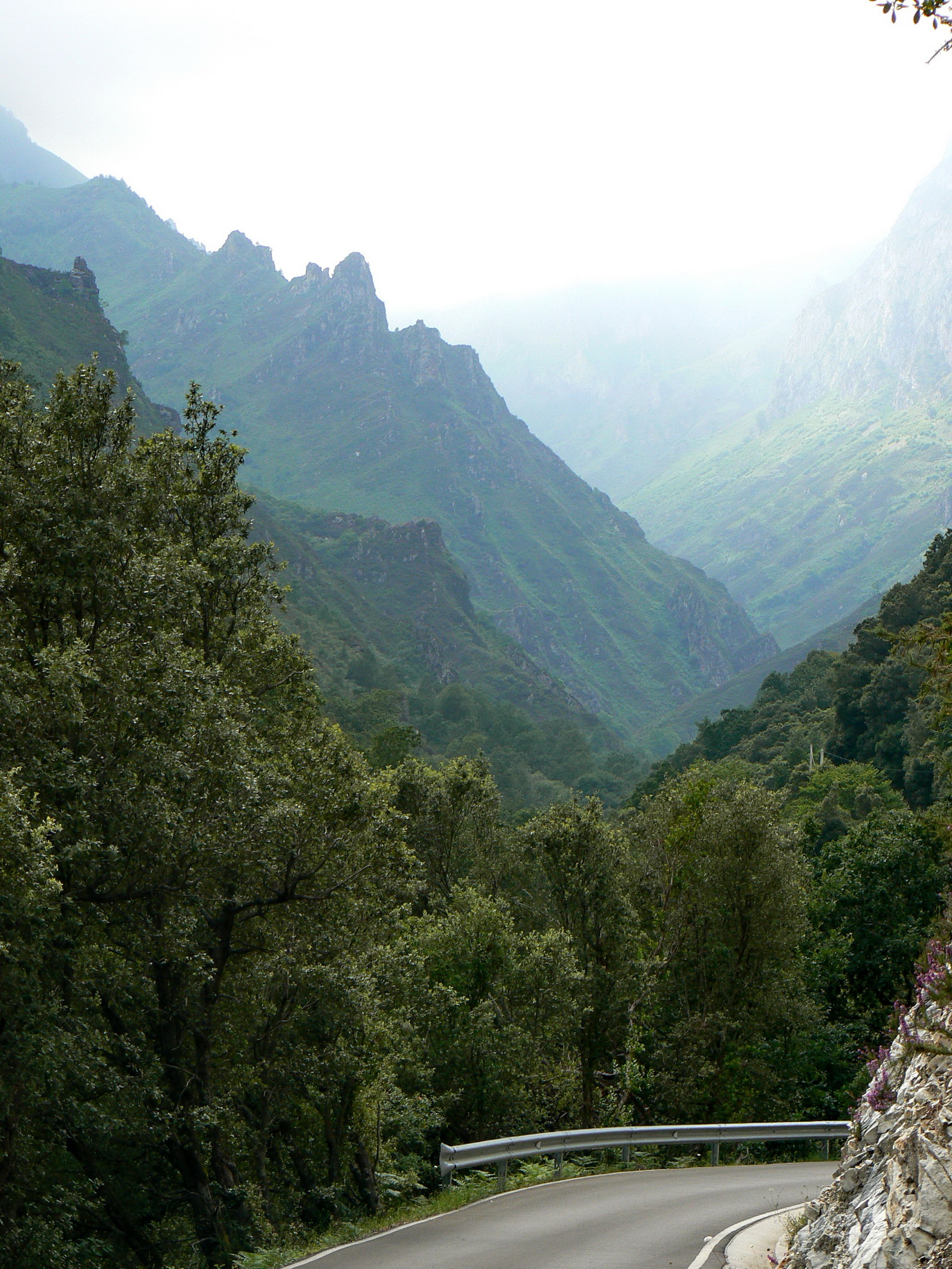
A view of the Cantabrian Mountains, habitat of the bear

In 2005 the presence of brown bears was reported near the Portuguese border (less than 20 km (12 miles)) on the Trevinca range, based on footprints left on a big mud pad. In 2019, one brown bear was confirmed by the Portuguese authorities to have roamed across the border, and evidence suggests this was not an isolated event, as footprints from the early months of the year and local sightings confirm. Bears had not been seen in Portugal for over a hundred years and were believed extinct.

== Protection status ==
The Cantabrian brown bear is catalogued on the Spanish Red List of Endangered Species as in danger of extinction. In Europe it is listed in the European Mammal Assessment as critically endangered. On an international level, it is listed on the IUCN Red List of Threatened Species as being of least concern due to the existence of relatively healthy populations of brown bears elsewhere. In Spain there is a maximum fine of €300,000 for killing a bear following a ban on hunting of the species in 1973.

== Threats ==
In the smaller eastern population, endogamy has led to genetic complications including the higher probability of birth defects and a higher ratio of male to female births (more males than females). Added to this is the extreme philopatry usually exhibited by female brown bears which leads to a very slow dispersal rate of reproductive females. Another present threat comes in the form of the EU's bovine spongiform encephalopathy (BSE) laws which are enforcing the removal of carcasses from the countryside. Though only a small part of the Cantabrian brown bear's mainly vegetarian diet, carrion is very important for the building of fat reserves ready for the winter and, in spring, is a vital source of sustenance following the rigours of the winter. It is hoped that these disease containment measures will be revised following a meeting of concerned Spanish environmentalists with the European Commission in October 2007. There has been concern that recent mild winters, possibly due to climate change, have not been severe enough to necessitate hibernation. However, the bears are sometimes active during cold winter weather for reasons which are not entirely clear.

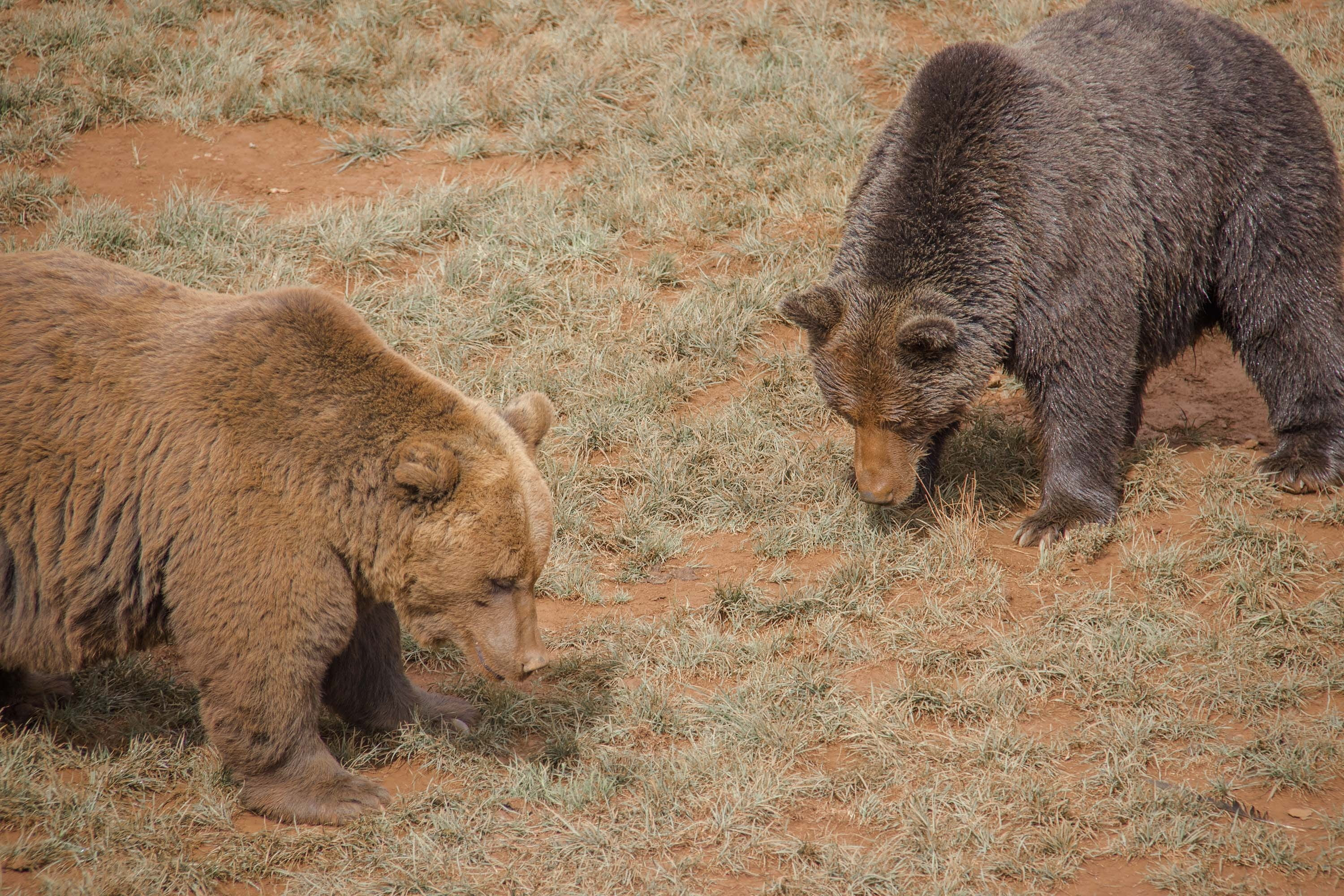
Cantabrian brown bears in captivity at Cabárceno

Man-made infrastructures such as roads and railways inhibit the population growth of the Cantabrian brown bear. The most recent human threat is a proposal to build a ski/winter leisure resort in the San Glorio pass, a site in the eastern region of the bears' habitat. Despite the fact that Spain's ministry of the environment, in its Catálogo Nacional de Especies Amenazadas, lists the brown bear as in danger of extinction in Spain, and the existence of heavy fines aimed at protecting the few remaining bears, hardly a year passes without yet another bear having been killed by human intervention. According to an article published December 2007 in the Spanish national daily El País, eight brown bears had been killed, either by poisoned bait or illegal hunting, in the Cantabrian Mountains since the year 2000.

== Conservation ==
An "Action Plan for the Conservation of the Brown Bear (Ursus arctos) in Europe", published in 2000, made specific recommendations for the management of bears in Spain.

The Spanish Ministry of the Environment had previously drawn up a "Plan para la Recuperación del Oso Pardo" (Plan for the Recovery of the Brown Bear) with the intention of saving the species from extinction by coordinating conservation efforts across the autonomous communities in which it currently lives. Among the responsibilities of regional governments are various natural parks which provide suitable habitat for bears. Bears appear not to have a permanent presence in the only national park in the Cantabrian mountains, the Picos de Europe National Park. As of 2014 the population was estimated at 300 bears.

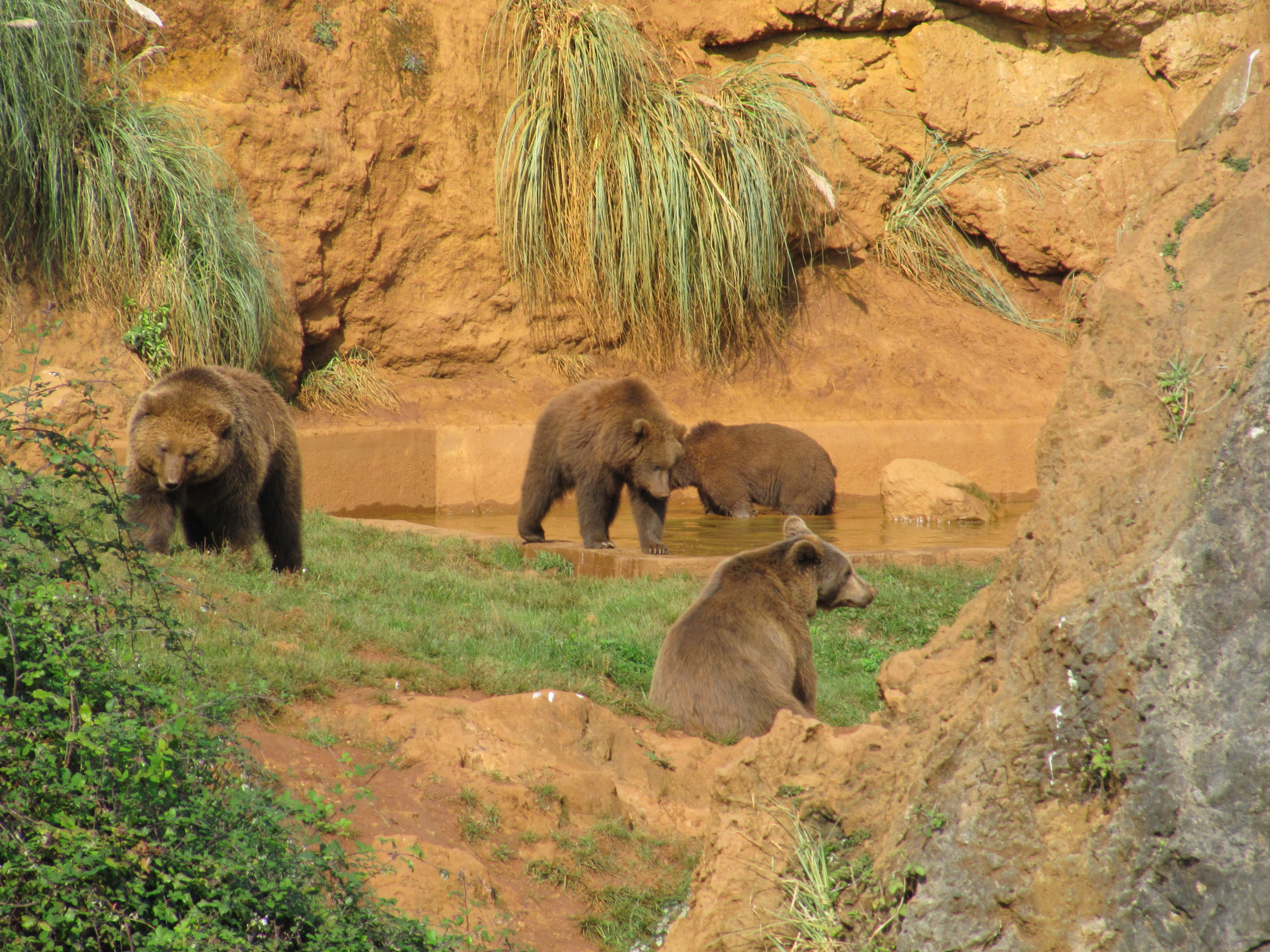
Alpha male bear (left) and his herd at Cabárceno

Bear habitat is monitored by patrols and education programmes are underway, particularly among the young but also among hunting groups. A project of photo "trapping" is enjoying success and another of radio-tracking individuals is being considered. Apart from continuing scientific research, conservation efforts currently centre on joining the two sub-populations of Spanish bears in order to create a viable population. Conservation groups are working to enhance centuries-old corridors used by the bears and are planting fruit trees and siting beehives to supplement their diet. There has been support for corridors from the EU LIFE programme focusing on a corridor between the two subpopulations and a corridor out of Somiedo Natural Park. UNESCO's proposed integration of existing Cantabrian biosphere reserves within a Gran Cantábrica super-reserve is also intended to help the bears expand their range via, for example, the comarca of Os Ancares.

== See also ==
- List of mammals of Cantabria
- Marsican brown bear
- Bear conservation
- International Bear Association
- IUCN Red List of Threatened Species
- Threatened species
