= Cannelle (disambiguation) =

Cannelle may refer to:

- the French word for cinnamon
- a character in Passe-Partout, a Quebec French language children's television program

== Places ==
- Cannelle, a commune in the Corse-du-Sud department of France on the island of Corsica
- a bay in Isola del Giglio, Italy

== Other ==
- Ambre Cannelle, a fragrance by French perfume manufacturer Creed
- Cannelle (bear), a Pyrenean bear killed in 2004
- Fontana delle Sette Cannelle, a fountain in Tuscania, Italy
- Fontana delle 99 Cannelle, a fountain in L'Aquila, Italy
- Torre delle Cannelle, a tower in Talamone, Italy
- Cannelle, a french singer

== See also ==
- Cannella (disambiguation), various meanings including a surname
