= Vidal de Canellas =

- Bishop of Huesca
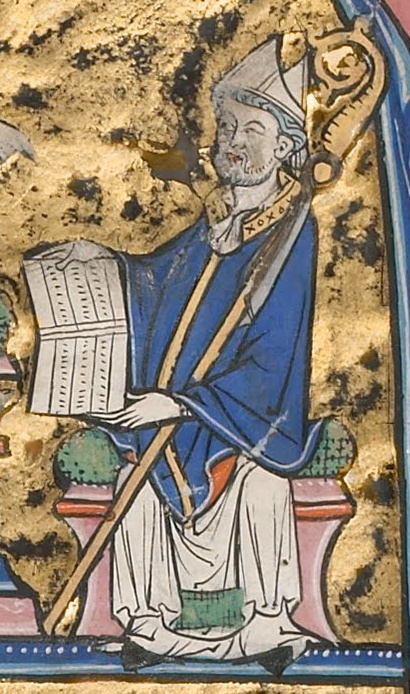
- Vidal presenting the laws of Aragon to James I
- Diocese: Huesca
- Appointed: 1237
- Installed: 1238
- Predecessor: García de Gúdal
- Successor: Domingo de Sola
- Previous post: provost of the See of Barcelona

Personal details
- Born: c. 1190 Canyelles, Principality of Catalonia
- Died: 1252 Huesca, Kingdom of Aragon
- Buried: Huesca Cathedral
- Education: University of Bologna
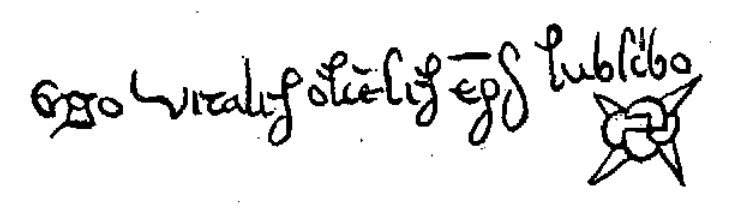
- Signature: Vidal de Canellas's signature
Ordination history of Vidal de Canellas
History
Episcopal consecration
- Principal consecrator: Pere d'Albalat
- Co-consecrators: Bernat Calbó

Vidal de Canellas was bishop of Huesca from 1238 to 1252 and compiler of the first written laws of the Kingdom of Aragon, known as the Vidal Major in Aragonese and used as the primary legal source for several centuries.

== Early life ==
Little is known about Vidal's early life and family with certainty. It is presumed he was born in or around the town of Canyelles in the 1190s. Though he was fond of the religious tradition of the See of Barcelona, this does not necessarily mean he was from the city itself, but he was almost certainly raised in the municipality of Barcelona. He had a brother, Berenguer, and a relative called Ramón. James I of Aragon was related to Vidal by blood, but to what measure is unknown. Ramón's relation to Vidal is not known, but is presumed as the name Cañellas (with variations, observed near Huesca from about 1180 with record of Ramón) is neither an Aragonese name nor encountered otherwise during the era. According to Félix Torres Amat, Vidal was from a family distinguished in Catalonia, though scholars disagree on the family coat of arms.

Also known as Vital, his byname in Catalan was Cañellas, which became Canellas in Spanish: although he wrote it in Latin – as Cannellis – the Spanish rendering became most common.

== Ordination and legal advisory ==
Vidal studied both common law and canonical law at Barcelona Cathedral and the University of Bologna, at the time the most important law school in Europe. He was there in 1221 and would have been a student of Raymond of Peñafort. Vidal and Raymond remained good friends throughout their lives. He was already a legal mediator by this point, probably being the Magister Vitalis who in 1217 and 1219 made rulings in cases between the bishop of Huesca and Santa Maria Church in Alquézar. For one matter in 1219, seeking clarification, Pope Honorius III interrogated Vidal and the then-bishop of Huesca García de Gúdal. In 1234 he became provost of the See of Barcelona and two years later was nominated to become a bishop. As provost, Vidal stated there was harm he caused, which he sought to remedy in his will.

When García resigned on 6 July 1236, a replacement was desired immediately and Vidal was elevated before the Pope even sent someone to question why García could not continue. Upon confirmation that García would step aside, Vidal was immediately elected by Huesca and Jaca.

According to Catholic-Hierarchy.org, Vidal was appointed bishop in 1237 and ordained the following year. His principal consecrator was Pere d'Albalat, then bishop of Lleida, with Bernat Calbó – a fellow legal scholar and then bishop of Vic – the co-consecrator. Vidal was given the municipality of Alboraya by James I in 1238 after his mediation between crown and nobility following the Conquest of Valencia, enabling its full capture. He witnessed the truce with Zayyan ibn Mardanish and contributed to dividing the lands and properties of Valencia, planning the construction of Valencia Cathedral, and drafting the Furs of Valencia. Aragonese nobility felt that Valencia should be governed the same as Aragon, absorbed into the kingdom and distributed, while James I intended to implement municipal law; until the Furs of Valencia were introduced, Valencia was ruled as Aragon, and it was conceded for some Valencia cities to retain Aragon laws.

Alboraya and Almassora were sparsely populated farmland when designated to Vidal to be incorporated into the diocese of Huesca; while buildings and properties within the town of Alboraya were awarded to other knights, the settlement was given to Vidal and the first church was founded there on 28 June 1240. Both towns were handed to Teresa Gil de Vidaure (James I's third wife) when Vidal died, though Vidal's ownership of Almassora by the time he died was disputed. Other lands awarded to Vidal by James I on 10 June 1238, and disputed, include an Alcúdia and a Vilanova. Vidal's first dispute as bishop was denoted on 1 January 1238, a jurisdictional dispute brought by the Abbey of San Pedro el Viejo, which had historically been granted episcopal semi-autonomy. The resolution led to the creation of a new parish within Huesca, which Vidal granted to the priory and monks of San Pedro el Viejo, to manage appropriately, in 1249. Vidal also had disputes with the secular council of Huesca in the 1240s, as they withheld the tithes for the diocese; royal decrees had to be ordered three times for the council to hand over the church's money.

In 1242, the church of Alquézar was re-assigned from the diocese of Tortosa to that of Huesca, unilaterally by James I and Pere d'Albalat (by then, bishop of the Archdiocese of Tarragona), due to the bishop of Tortosa misusing it. On 2 August 1242, Vidal appealed to the Pope on behalf of Alquézar as well as Barbastro Cathedral, which had a financial complaint against the bishop of Tortosa and complaint over number of clergy against Vidal as bishop of Huesca. Though an agreement was reached in November that year, Barbastro – now annexed to Huesca but aiming to head its own diocese again – brought lawsuits against Vidal in 1251, with Vidal agreeing to James I and his notary acting as arbiters.

Vidal again himself intervened to mediate disputes at councils in Tarragona between 1239 and 1249, Valencia in 1240, Lyon in 1245, and Lleida in 1246; in disputes between James I and the Knights Templar; and mediated land disputes between James' children. Vidal is described as being not only a highly sought-after mediator and arbiter, due to his knowledge and sensible demeanor, but also as having been James' constant companion, confidante, and advisor. When knights and noblemen of Aragon were in 1240 again at odds with James I, unsure whether to remain his vassals, Vidal was present for James to swear he would keep loyal to them.

The Code of Huesca, which in translation (Vidal wrote in Latin) became known as the Vidal Major, was a compilation of laws and interpretation – influenced by the Furs of Jaca and his studies in Bologna – composed by Vidal likely between 1247 (after the Court of Huesca) and his death in 1252. James I convened a court in Huesca in 1247 to create laws of Aragon to apply across the entire kingdom, requesting Vidal to compile them. It is suggested in a prologue to the Vidal Major that, with Vidal's support and advice, James I may have tried to introduce legal reforms and other European innovations that would not have been accepted in Aragon. The Vidal Major was perhaps not widely accepted by the Aragonese public, either, with Vidal having exceeded his mandate from the Court of Huesca by including scholarly opinion and political content. Vidal's less controversial Minor compilation was more long lasting, and was likely the full approved version of laws of Aragon when presented at the 1265 Court of Ejea. There were only few amendments between what Vidal had approval for in 1247 and the Minor's content come 1300, after which James II of Aragon added another book. Nevertheless, the Vidal Major and its additional content on organisation of the kingdom retained authority and prestige, and Vidal's work remained Aragon's primary legal source for centuries.

== Death and legacy ==
Vidal's testament is dated 12 October 1252, indicating he died shortly thereafter. Vidal bequeathed all his books of common and canon law to Geraldón de Bañeras. He named his brother and Berenguer de Civaderia as executors of his will, while appointing Raymond as arbiter of a legal dispute between Vidal and Marimon de Plegamans over properties in Valencia.

In excavations of Huesca Cathedral in 1500, remains of early Aragon bishops were uncovered, including those of Vidal, and then re-interred in a sepulchre there. The Edificio Vidal de Canellas, originally part of the industry pavilion of Expo 2008, houses the courthouse of Zaragoza.

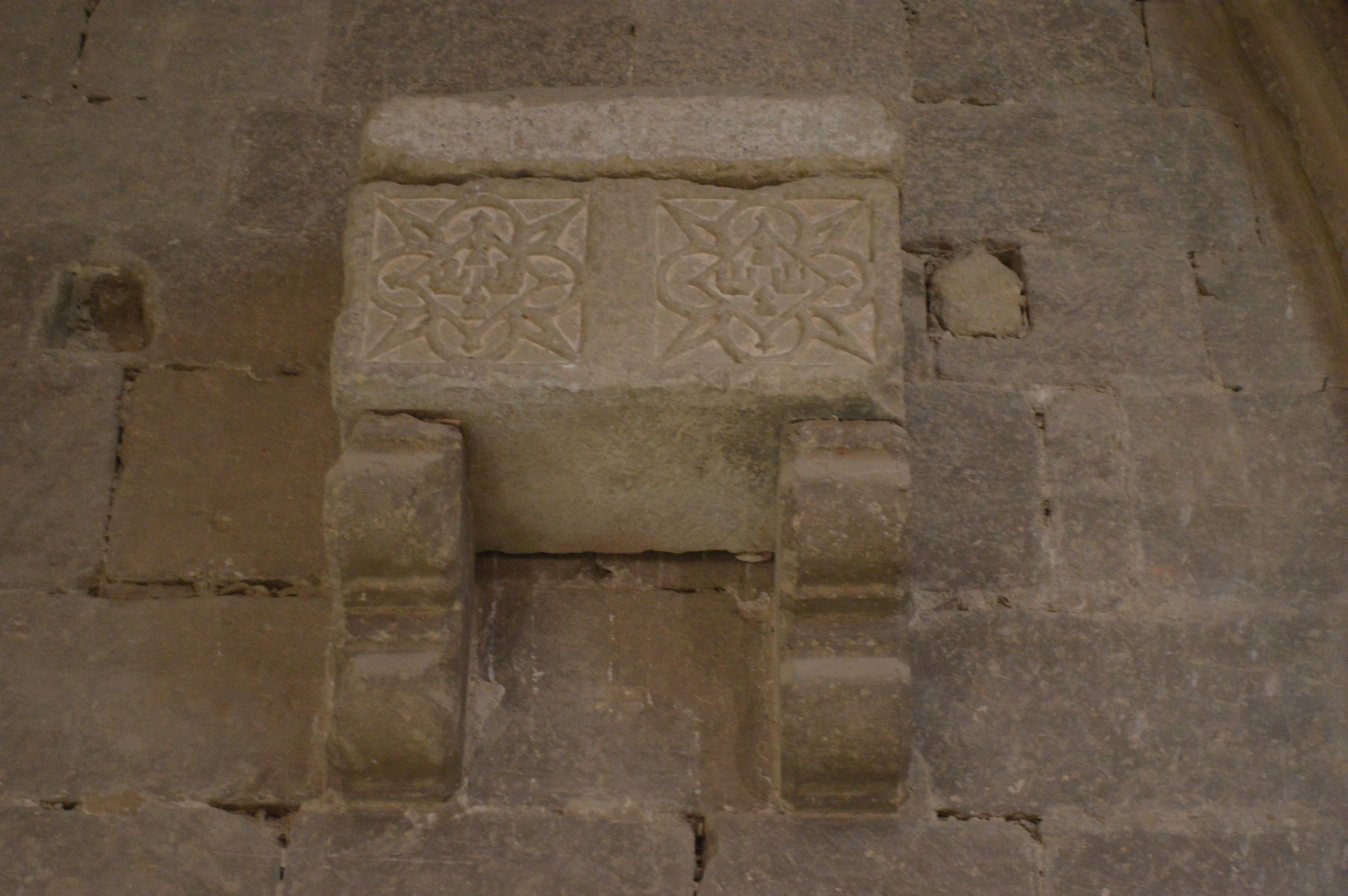
Sepulchre of the early bishops of Huesca

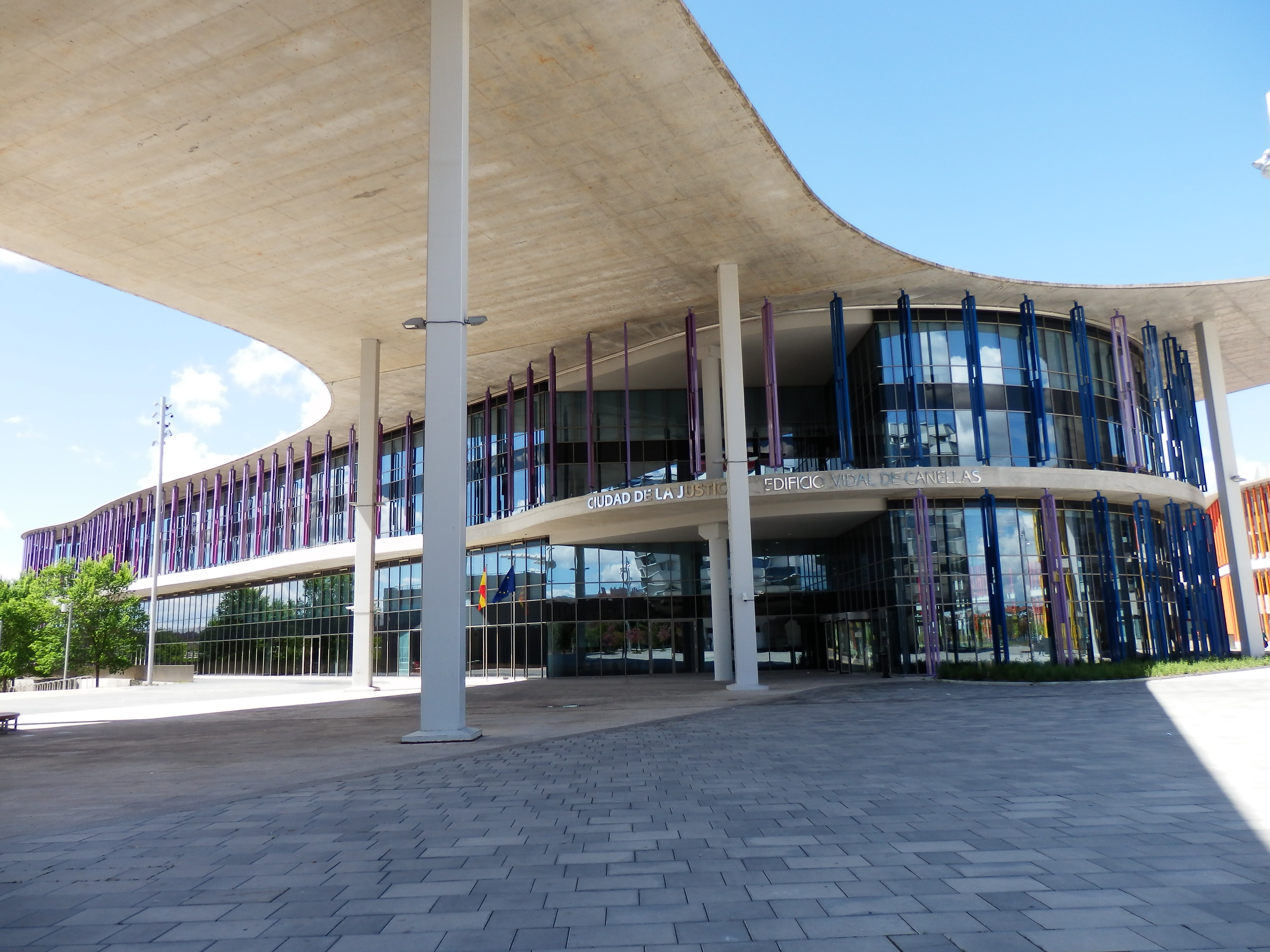
Edificio Vidal de Canellas
