= Canelas =

Canelas may refer to the following places:

== Mexico ==
- Canelas, Durango, a municipality in the state of Durango

== Portugal ==
- Canelas (Arouca), a civil parish in the municipality of Arouca
- Canelas (Estarreja), a civil parish in the municipality of Estarreja
- Canelas (Penafiel), a civil parish in the municipality of Penafiel
- Canelas (Peso da Régua), a civil parish in the municipality of Peso da Régua
- Canelas, Vila Nova de Gaia, a civil parish in the municipality of Vila Nova de Gaia

== Spain ==
- Canelas, Sanxenxo, a settlement in the municipality of Sanxenxo, autonomous community of Galicia

== See also ==
- Canela (disambiguation)
