= San Glorio =

Mountain pass in Spain

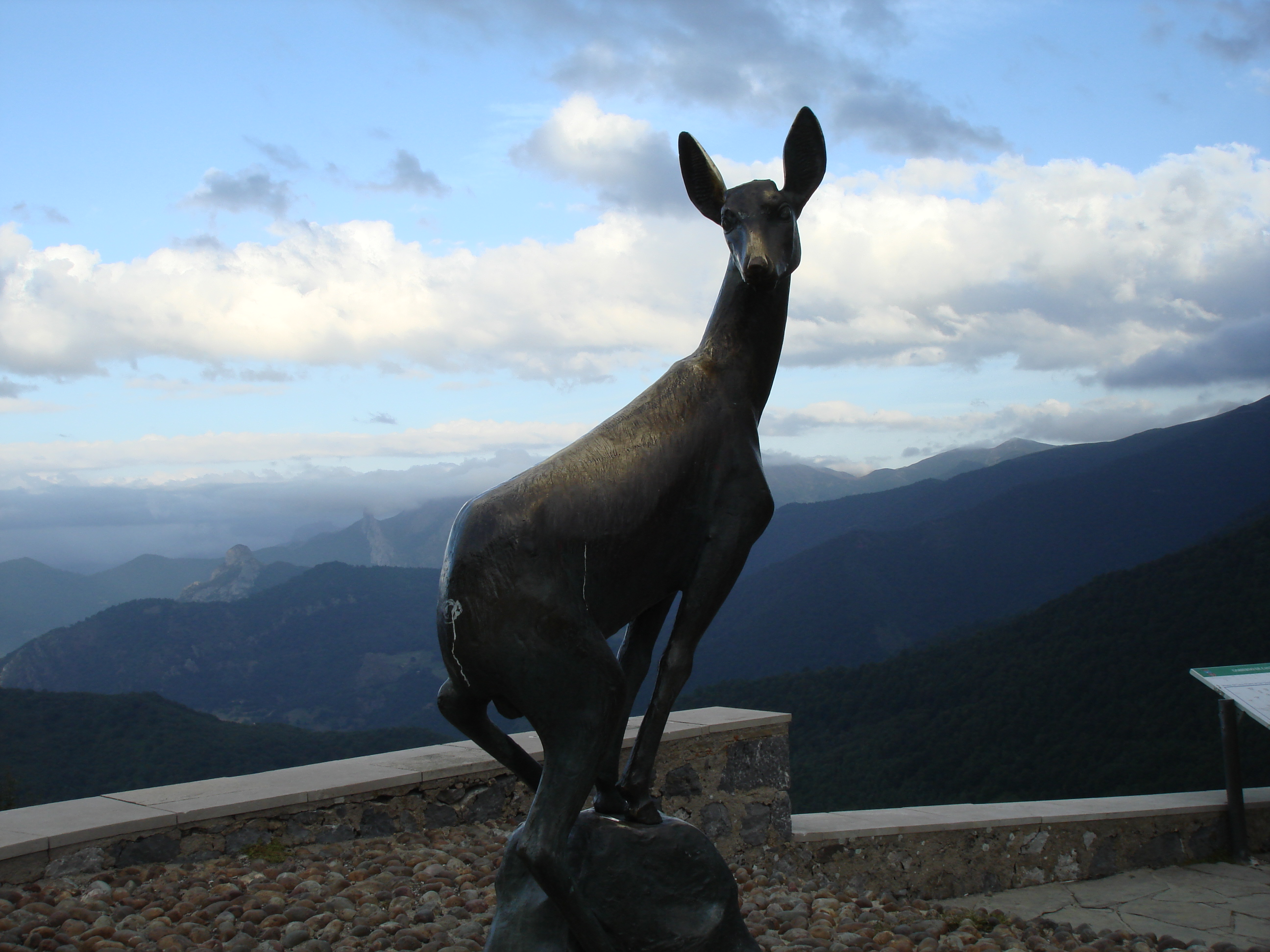

San Glorio is a mountain pass in the Cantabrian Mountains of Northern Spain. The pass reaches an elevation of 1610 meters along the national highway N621 which connects the city of León with Cantabria and which passes through Asturias. The pass is situated some 800m from the southern border of the Picos de Europa National Park, a park included in UNESCO's World Network of Biosphere Reserves and shared by the provinces of León, Asturias and Cantabria. The valleys of this part of the Cantabrian Mountains include sites in the European Union's Natura 2000 network and Special Protection Areas for the conservation of wild birds. San Glorio is used as a corridor by the Cantabrian brown bear Ursus arctos, catalogued in Spain as being in danger of extinction. Moreover, the slopes of the glacial valleys making up the surrounding region are home to an important variety of plant life.

== Ski resort project, environmental issues ==
San Glorio is also the name of a projected ski resort in the area. Involving some 60 kilometres of pistes, the development was first suggested in the 1970s. The current project was presented in 2003 and has so far not gone ahead due to legal challenges related to the environmental value of the area. The scientific community warned of irreparable damage that would result to the habitat from the construction of large facilities. Much of the land in question belongs to the Natural Park of Fuentes Carrionas y Fuente Cobre-Montaña Palentina.

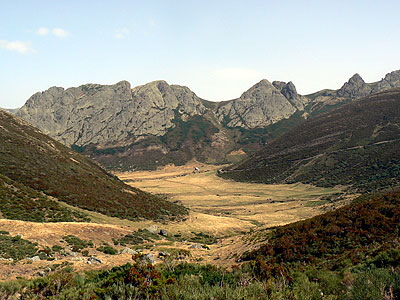
The Valle del Naranco, one of the valleys that may become car parking and access to the San Glorio winter sports development if the project goes ahead

According to a 2006 report published by the Ministry of the Environment, the Picos de Europa has "conservation problems at local level" due mainly to the role tourism plays, but also because there are

"...no planning regulations for this unequalled territory. The regional government of Castilla and León has commenced construction of a ski resort (Esla 2000), near the San Glorio mountain pass. A new road is also projected between Valdeón and Liébana, in Cantabria. The regional government of Asturias is already constructing another road from Sotres to Bulnes along the summits. Several mountain cable cars are also projected: the final assault has commenced."

A 2006 estimate put the Cantabrian Brown Bear population at around 140, these bears are divided between around 100-110 in the Western section and 25-30 in the Eastern. Spanish experts have warned that despite an evident rise, the bear population will not be viable until there are "several hundred". Asturias only has a 25% forest coverage, the lowest for any existing bear region in Europe (other bear areas have more than 50% forest coverage) and habitat improvement is therefore a key issue. Another problem is that of infrastructures. According to Jon Swenson, vice-president for Eurasia of the International Bear Association (IBA), the effect of a ski station would cause the same environmental impact as a town of 3,000 inhabitants and bears would keep at least 10 km away from such facilities.

In a paper presented in February 1989 at the Eighth International Conference on Bear Research and Management, Victoria, British Columbia, Canada, Christopher Servheen of the U.S. Fish and Wildlife Service stated that the continued reduction in habitat further isolates the two subpopulations in the Cantabrian Mountains, "making them more susceptible to the demographic and genetic consequences of small population size."

== Legal issues ==
Although Spain's Ministry for the Environment has opposed the development of San Glorio, the regional government of Castile and León has adopted major changes in regional planning which may permit future development, including the removal of a prohibition from March 2006 on the construction of ski resorts in the protected area of Fuentes Carrionas.

At the beginning of 2008, Spain's Defensor del Pueblo, with a direct mandate to initiate proceedings at Spain's Constitutional Court, submitted the following to Castilla and León's department of the environment:

"Que esa Consejería realice las gestiones pertinentes para que se proceda a derogar el Decreto 13/2006, al ser contrario a la legalidad vigente en materia de Espacios Naturales y Evaluación Ambiental, por no haber sido evaluada previamente la modificación del PORN de Fuentes Carrionas y Fuente Cobre-Montaña Palentina, que contiene tal Decreto".

(That the department [of the environment] take the necessary steps to repeal Law 13/2006, as it contravenes legislation in force regarding Natural Spaces and Environmental Assessment through there not having been a prior evaluation of the modification to the development plan of the Natural Park of Fuentes Carrionas y Fuente Cobre-Montaña Palentina which is contained in the Law in question.)

In March 2008, the High Court of Castilla y León ruled that the regional government's sudden change in its own planning regulations, solely with the intention of permitting a ski resort, not only went against its own regional law, but both the national law on nature conservation and the European Natura 2000 regulations. The Court accepted the results of research submitted by the University of Salamanca and Spain's Higher Council for Scientific Research (CSIC), both of which strongly criticised plans to develop within protected land.

The regional government attempted to respond to the legal challenge with a plagiarised report which had to be withdrawn. At the end of 2009 it produced another report which proposed that Fuentes Carrionas and Picos de Europa should be considered together as an area where ski resorts are possible.

== Initiatives ==
The consortium backing the San Glorio resort claims that its proposal is the only means of preventing the villages of the region from becoming depopulated. Similarly, the local population of the villages affected has come out in favour of the project, basing their arguments on what is claimed will be a boost to the local economy. However, the economic benefits are disputed by the NGOs leading the campaign against the project, who, in turn, accuse the promoters of the development of having merely speculative aims.

Both sides, on the one hand, the promoter and on the other hand, the association of NGOs opposing the development, have been collecting signatures in support of their respective initiatives. As of August 2007, the association of NGOs defending the protection of the nature park claimed to have collected 11,780 signatures, while the consortium of developers claimed to have collected 3,000 signatures.

A conference held August 2007, organised by SEO/Birdlife (Birdlife International's Spanish section) together with WWF/Adena (the World Wildlife Fund's Spanish office), and two Spanish bear conservation organisations (Fapas and Fundación Oso Pardo), reaffirmed these organisations' opposition to the project.

The issue has been raised before the European Parliament, with Euro-MP David Hammerstein requesting the European Commission to look into the funding of the project, claiming that the regional government receives EU funding because of the park's required protection as a most seriously threatened habitat, while at the same time applying for subsidies for the jobs at the projected ski resort and hotel complex.

== See also ==
- Bear conservation
