= Cañellas =

Cañellas is a Spanish surname. A variant of the name is Canellas. It was first recorded as a name in the 12th-century Kingdom of Aragon, with relatives of Vidal de Canellas. The family was notable and presumably from Canyelles, after which they assumed the byname.

Notable people with these surnames include:

== Cañellas ==
- Clara Basiana Cañellas (born 1991), Spanish synchronized swimmer
- Gabriel Cañellas (born 1941), Spanish politician
- Joan Cañellas (born 1986), Spanish handball player
- Joan González Cañellas (born 2002), Spanish footballer
- Mateu Cañellas (born 1972), Spanish middle-distance runner and politician
- Salvador Cañellas (born 1944), Spanish motorcycle road racer and rally driver
- Xavier Cañellas (born 1997), Spanish racing cyclist

== Canellas ==
- Horst-Gregorio Canellas (1921–1999), Spanish-German entrepreneur and football official
- Thadeu Gomes Canellas (1930–2026), Brazilian Catholic bishop
- Vincent Capo-Canellas (born 1967), French politician

== See also ==
- Cannella, people with surnames Cannella, Canella or Canela
- Vidal de Canellas
