= Ursus (journal) =

- Discipline: Mammalogy
- Language: English
- Edited by: Andrew Derocher

Publication details
- Former name(s): Bears: Their Biology and Management, Proceedings of the Bear Workshop (International Conference on Bear Research and Management)
- History: 1968, 1972–present
- Publisher: International Association for Bear Research and Management
- Frequency: Biannual
- Impact factor: 1.094 (2016)

Standard abbreviations
- ISO 4: Ursus

Indexing
- ISSN: 1537-6176 (print); 1938-5439 (web)

Links
- Journal homepage

Ursus is a biannual peer-reviewed scientific journal covering all topics about or related to bears. It is published by the International Association for Bear Research and Management. It is the only scientific journal dedicated to the world's eight species of bears.

The journal was established in 1968 as Proceedings of the Bear Workshop (International Conference on Bear Research and Management). In 1972 it was renamed as Bears: Their Biology and Management. It became Ursus in 1998.

The journal has been online only since 2019.

The editor is Andrew Derocher of the University of Alberta. Derocher became the editor in 2021, taking over from Jon Swenson.
