= Cannella =

Cannella, Canella and Canela are surnames ultimately originating from the Latin canna 'small cane'. Notable people with these surnames include:

== Canela ==
- Ailton Canela (1994–2016), Brazilian footballer
- Andoni Canela (born 1969), Spanish photographer
- Jason Canela (born 1992), American actor
- Jencarlos Canela (born 1988), American singer, songwriter and actor
- Kauê Canela (born 2004), Brazilian footballer
- Mercè Canela (born 1956), Catalan writer and translator
- Miguel Canela Lázaro (1894–1977), Dominican medical scientist
- Teresa Canela Giménez (born 1959), Spanish chess player

== Canella ==
- Carlo Canella (1800–1879), Italian painter
- Francesco Canella (born 1939), Italian footballer
- Giulio Canella (early 20th century), Italian scholar whose disappearance was part of the Bruneri-Canella case
- Giuseppe Canella (1788–1847), Italian painter
- Grimaldo Canella (died c. 1184), Consul of Genoa
- Otto Canella (died 1143), Consul of Genoa
- Roberto Canella (born 1988), Spanish footballer
- Valeria Canella (born 1982), Italian long jumper

== Cannella ==
- Anthony Cannella (born 1969), American politician
- Frank Cannella (born 1957), American businessman and philanthropist
- Giampiero Cannella (born 1965), Italian politician
- John Matthew Cannella (1908–1996), American jurist
- Sal Cannella (born 1943), American politician

== See also ==
- Cañellas, people with surnames Cañellas or Canellas
