= Bear conservation =

Management of bears and their habitat

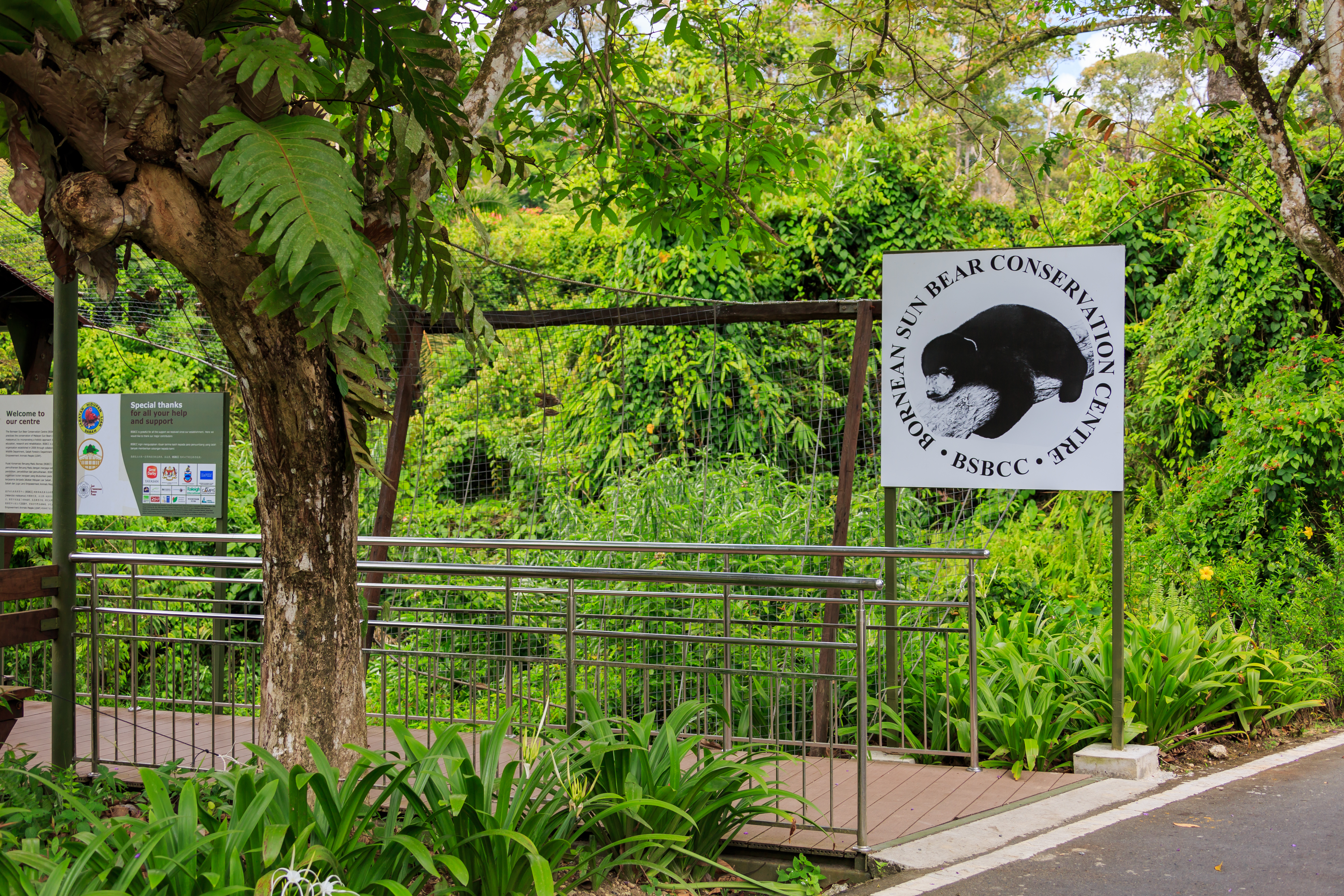
Bornean Sun Bear Conservation Centre in Malaysia.

Bear conservation refers to the management of bears and their habitat with a view to preventing their extinction.

Bears face serious threats on many fronts, most of which are due to human activity. Whether indirect, as in human encroachment on their natural habitats due to crop cultivation, deforestation or timber harvest, or directly from their killing for protection of property or for unregulated or sport hunting, or for their use in primitive medicines and aphrodisiacs.

== Management ==
In a paper presented at the International Bear Association’s Eighth International Conference on Bear Research and Management, Victoria, British Columbia, Canada, in 1989, Christopher Servheen, of the U.S. Fish and Wildlife Service, stated that

Conservation efforts on bears must be based on accurate biological information and knowledge of the habitat requirements of the species. Even when required biological data are available, implementation of conservation efforts requires an effective governmental commitment and incorporation of the needs of the local people into bear conservation. Management implementation and public education remain the greatest challenges in bear conservation.

== International co-operation ==
According to Servheen, bear conservation efforts vary from the intensive and highly organized management of the grizzly bear in the United States to little management in Asian countries. However, since 2004 the non-profit organization Free the Bears (FTB) has been working to rescue bears in Asia along with educating the local communities. They help combat the illegal wildlife trade of bears and often transport the rescues to world-class sanctuaries. This dedicated program is not only working to reduce illegal trade and capture of bears in the Asian area but other impoverished and dangerous parts of the world.

Likewise, successful international co-operation in conservation and management is exemplified by the work done on the polar bear in the Arctic. Several other species also need international cooperation to if they are to survive.

== IUCN Red List ==
Except for the brown bear (Ursus arctos) and the American black bear (U. americanus), the other six of bear species are threatened according to the IUCN Red List, including:

- the giant panda (Ailuropoda melanoleuca)
- the polar bear (U. maritimus)
- the spectacled bear (Tremarctos ornatus)
- the Asiatic black bear (U. thibetanus)
- the sloth bear (Melursus ursinus)
- the sun bear (Helarctos malayanus)

However, even species of "least concern" such as the brown bear are at risk of extirpation in certain countries or regions beyond their range in North America, parts of Europe, and the former Soviet Union.

The process of decline and/or extinction of the brown bear in Europe is well documented. Starting with their extinction in Denmark around 3000 BC, in Great Britain during the 10th century, in eastern Germany in 1770, in Bavaria in 1836, in Switzerland in 1904, and in the French Alps in 1937.

== Regional variations ==
Although the inclusion of the brown bear as of least concern on the 2006 IUCN Red List of Threatened Species refers to their global population, the fact is that local populations are increasingly becoming scarcer. And as the IUCN itself adds

Least Concern does not always mean that species are not at risk. There are declining species that are evaluated as Least Concern.

Such regional variations are most obvious in Spain where the only remaining bear, the Cantabrian brown bear is under threat.

=== Europe ===
==== Spain ====
Spain’s ministry of the environment, in its Catálogo Nacional de Especies Amenazadas lists the brown bear as in danger of extinction in Spain.

According to an article published December 2007 in the Spanish national daily El País, eight brown bears had been killed, either by poisoned bait or illegal hunting, in the Cantabrian Mountains since 2000. The Cantabrian brown bear population is currently (2007) estimated at around 170, divided between the 140 in the western section and 25-30 in the eastern. Leading Spanish experts have warned that the bear population will not be viable until there are "several hundred". One way forward is to reverse the fragmentation of the bears' habitat by creating "corridors". However, their viability is compromised by the regional authorities' keenness to allow construction of a ski resort at San Glorio, a project which has met strong opposition from many sectors, as well as that of the central government.

== See also ==
- Polar bear conservation
- Threatened species
