= Cabárceno Natural Park =

Zoo and nature reserve in Penagos, Spain

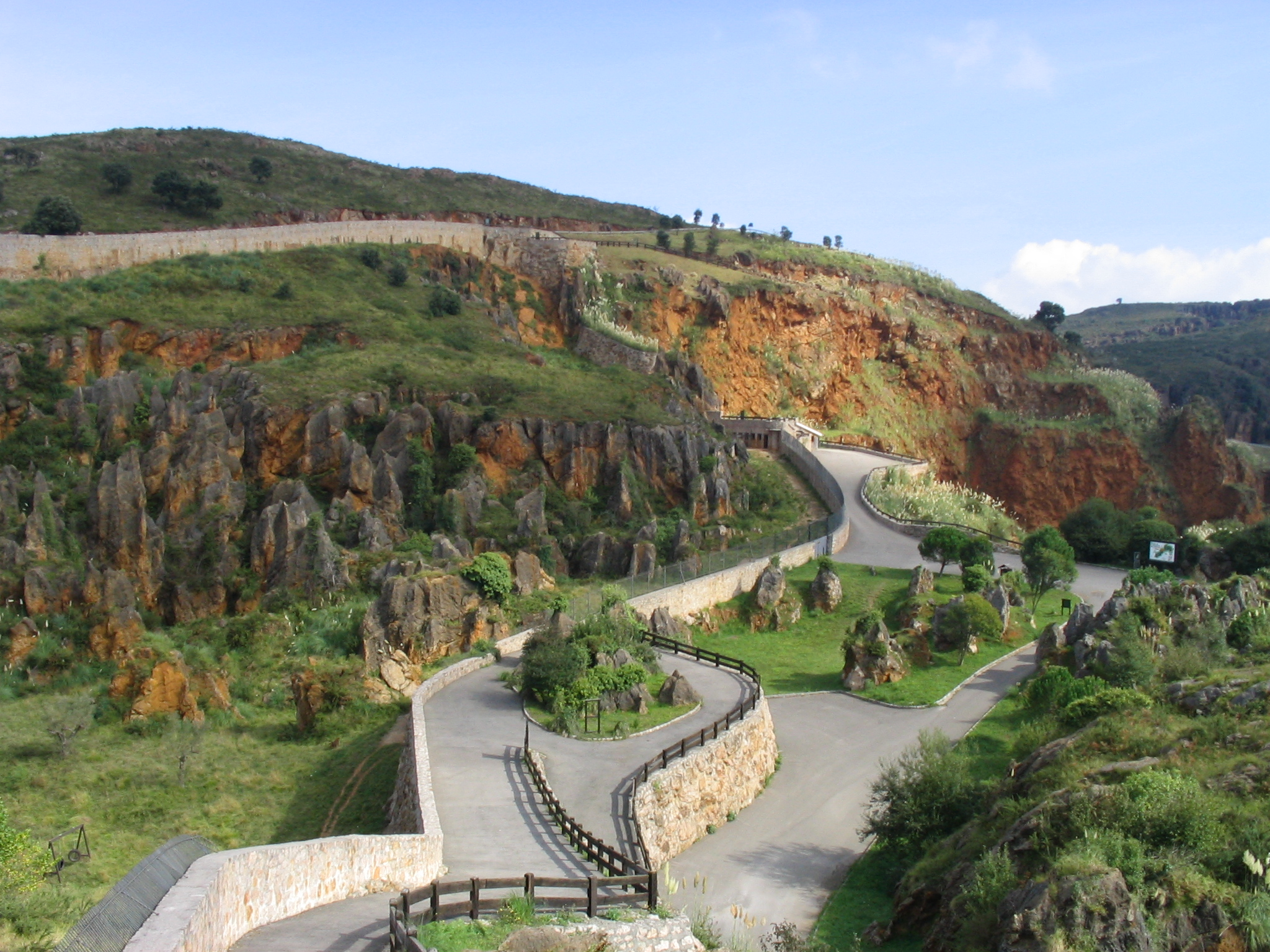
- Park grounds
- Interactive map of Cabárceno Natural Park
- 43°21′00″N 3°51′08″W
- Date opened: 1989
- Location: Penagos (Cantabria)
- Land area: 750 ha (1,900 acres)
- No. of species: >112
- Memberships: EAZA
- Major exhibits: Raptors, sea lions
- Website: www.parquedecabarceno.com

Cabárceno Natural Park (Spanish: Parque de la Naturaleza de Cabárceno) is a zoo and nature reserve located in the town of Penagos, Spain, 17 kilometres (11 mi) south of Santander.

The park is located in a former open-pit iron mine on a karstic landscape consisting of 750 hectares. It now belongs to Cantur, a tourism state-owned enterprise of the Government of Cantabria.

The Cabárceno Natural Park has two main purposes: the conservation of endangered species and environmental education.

== Cabárceno Natural Park ==
The natural park of Cabárceno is a naturalised space reclaimed from 750 hectares (1,900 acres) of former open-pit mines and restored to the primitive beauty of the karst landscape.

The natural park is home to 100 animal species from five continents living in semi-captive conditions, including large enclosures where one or more species coexist.

Except for the food provided to them, the animals enjoy almost total freedom. Their environment and limited human interference allow the animals to live undisturbed as they would in the wild to promote a healthy ecosystem for all the species living in the zoo.

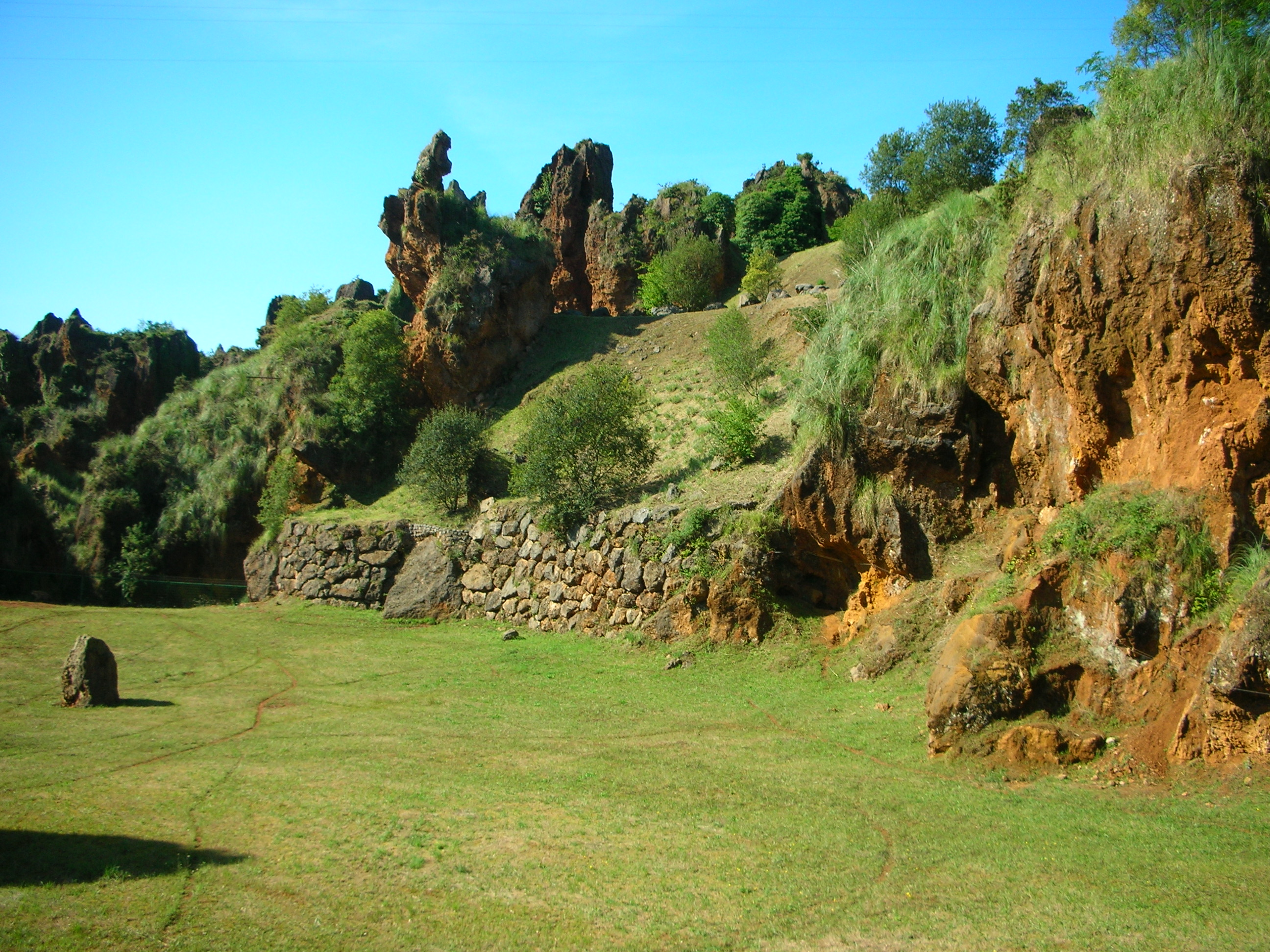
Nature in Cabárceno

The park has more than 20 kilometres (12 mi) of roads as well as numerous parking areas and footpaths. The natural scenery of the park includes gorges, lakes, and rock formations.

== Reptiles ==
The reptile section is located at the entrance of the park, next to the café La Mina. Turtles, lizards, and several venomous snakes, such as cobras, rattlesnakes, and some species of giant snakes, can be found in this area of the zoo.

== Animals ==
The park has many animal species, including:

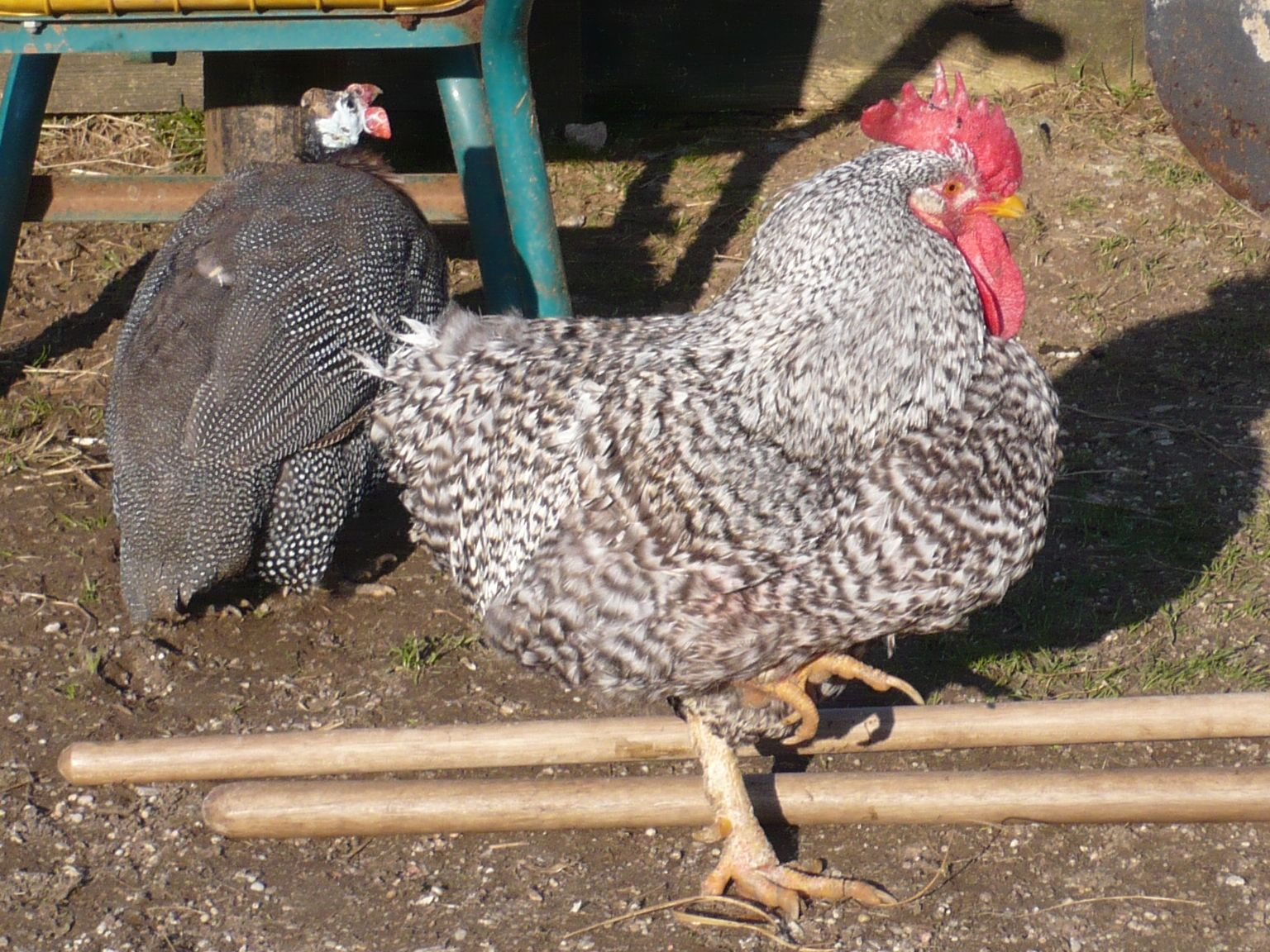
Predresa chicken breed in Cabárceno

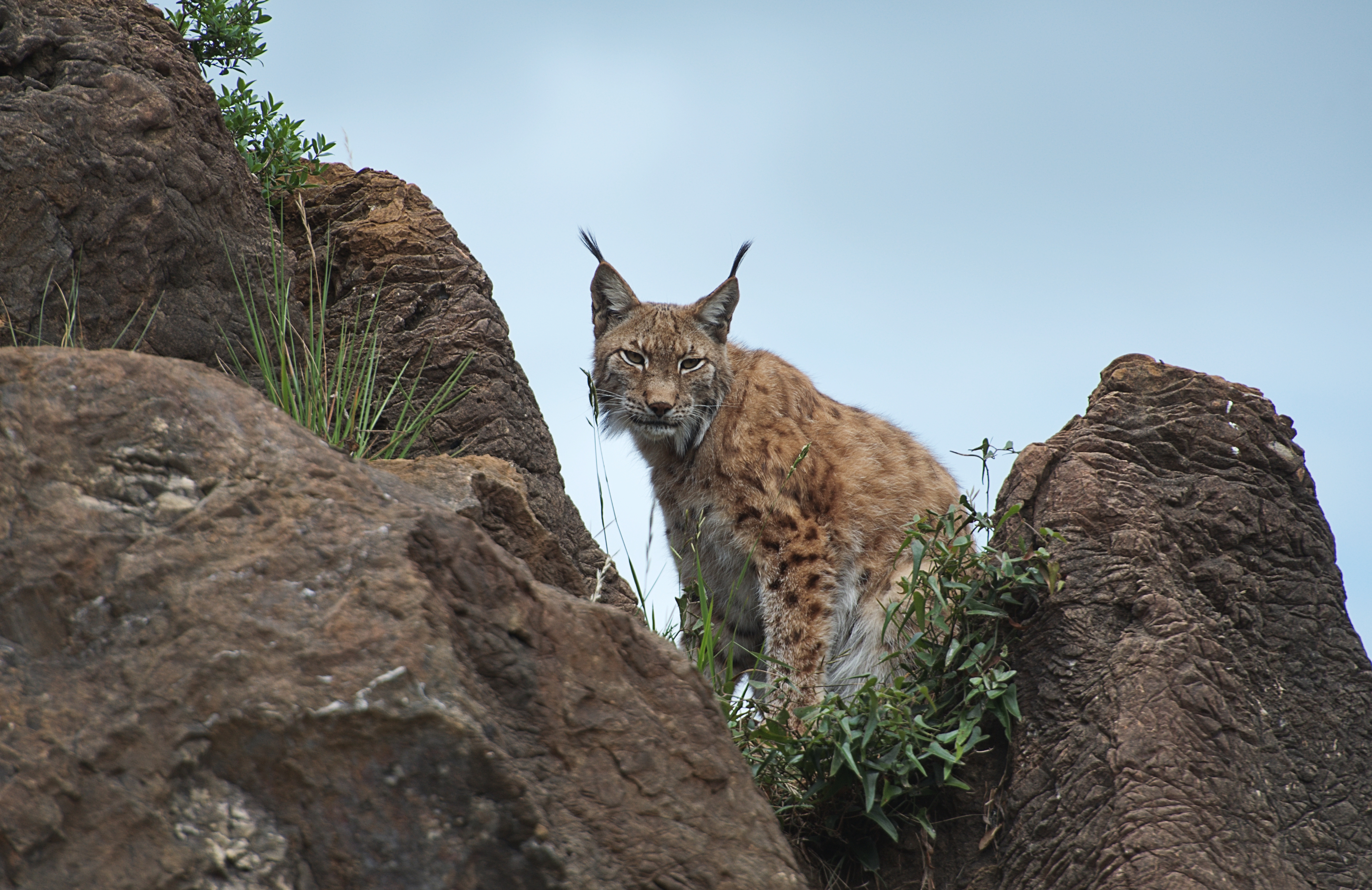
Eurasian lynx in Cabárceno

- Addax
- Sable Antelope
- Zebra
- Grevy's zebra
- Pere David Deer
- Cobo lichi
- Coypu
- Dromedary
- Common Eland
- African Elephant
- Emu
- Warthog
- Fallow deer
- Gaur
- Western Lowland Gorilla
- Spotted hyena
- Hippo
- Pygmy hippopotamus
- Impala
- Jaguar
- Giraffe
- Lion
- Lynx
- Lycaon
- Wolf
- Mouflon
- Cantabrian brown bear
- Olive baboons
- White Rhinoceros
- Blue Wildebeest
- Tiger
- Cattle
- Rhea

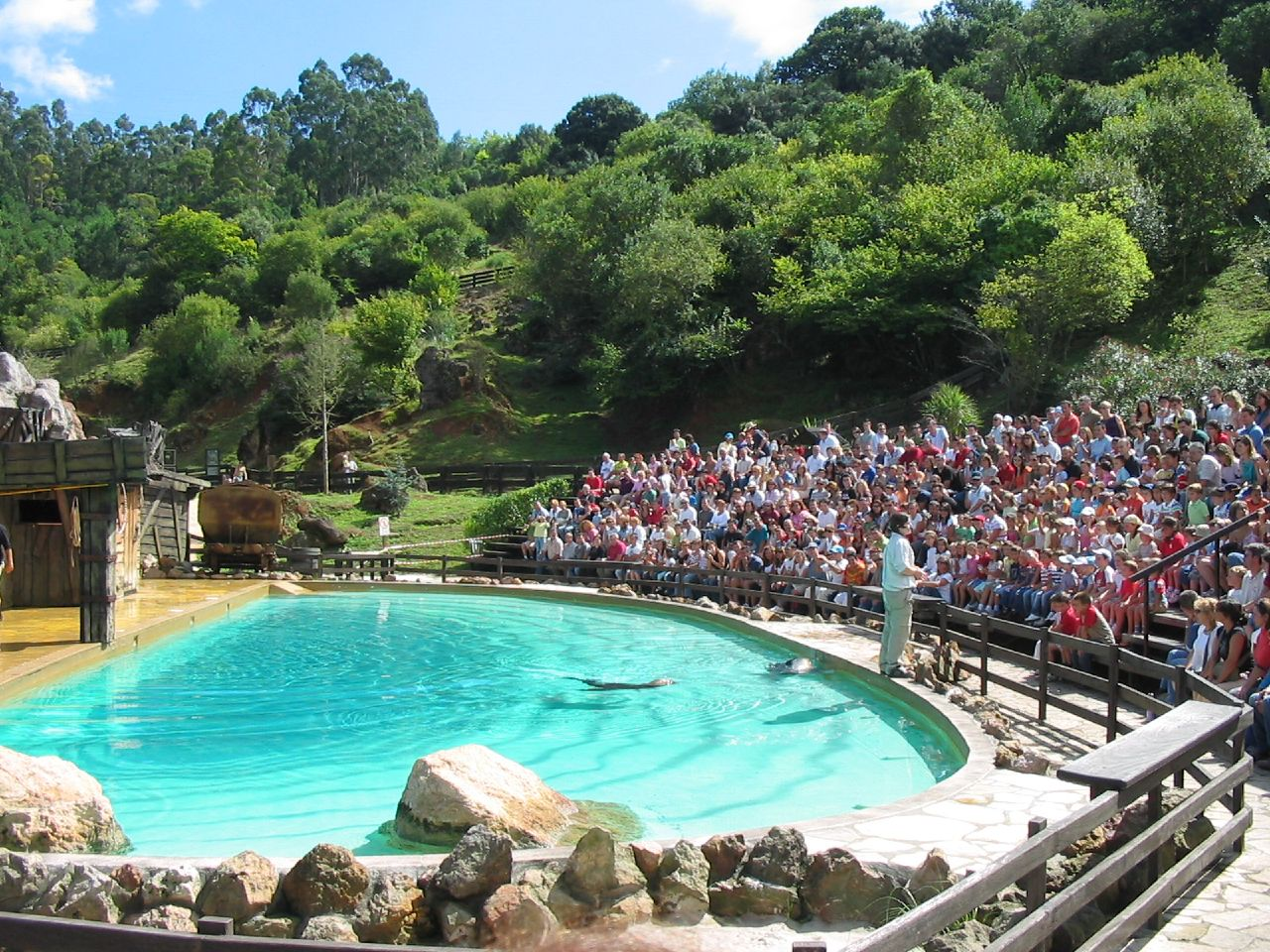
Sea lion show in Cabárceno

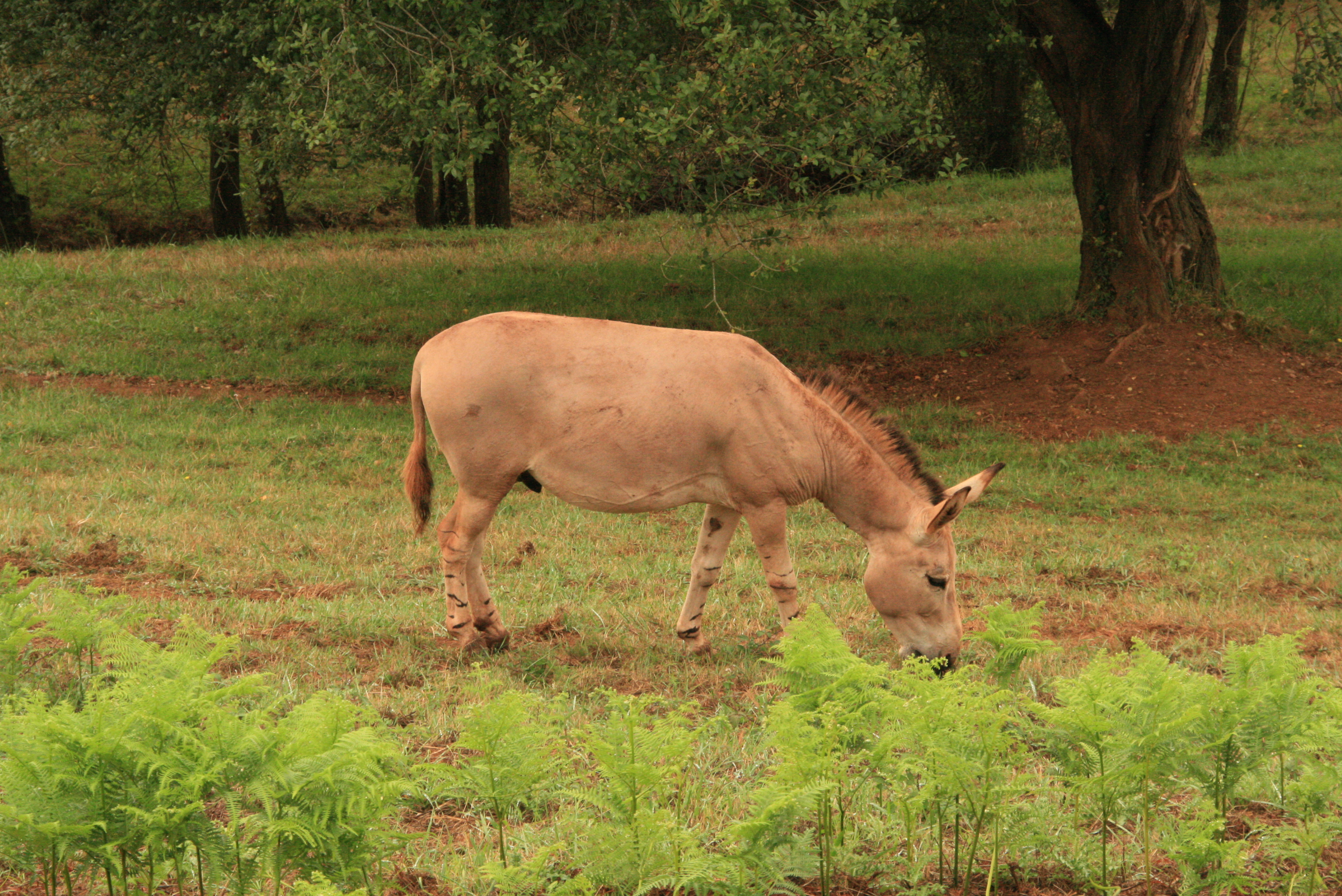
Somali wild ass in Carbárceno

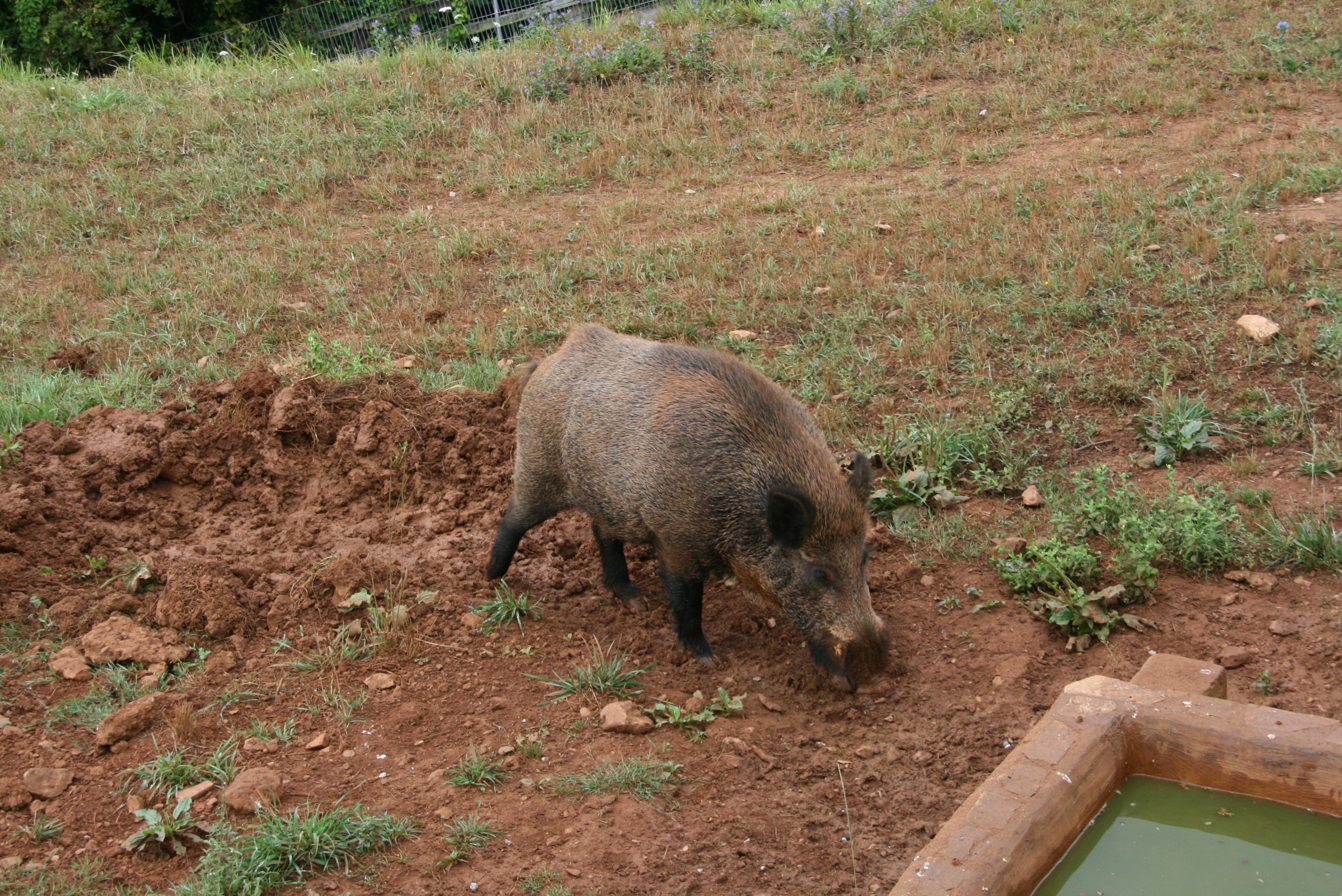
Wild boar in Cabárceno

== Facilities ==
There are several facilities available at the park, including a nurse station, public phones, ATMs, environmental classrooms, picnic areas, parking areas, a cafeteria, a restaurant, and souvenir shops. There is also a gondola to transport people throughout the park.

- Los Osos is located in the heart of the park opposite the exhibition of ostriches and antelopes. There is a restaurant, cafeteria, and souvenir shop with snacks, sandwiches and drinks. It has a terrace with a bear enclosure in the background.

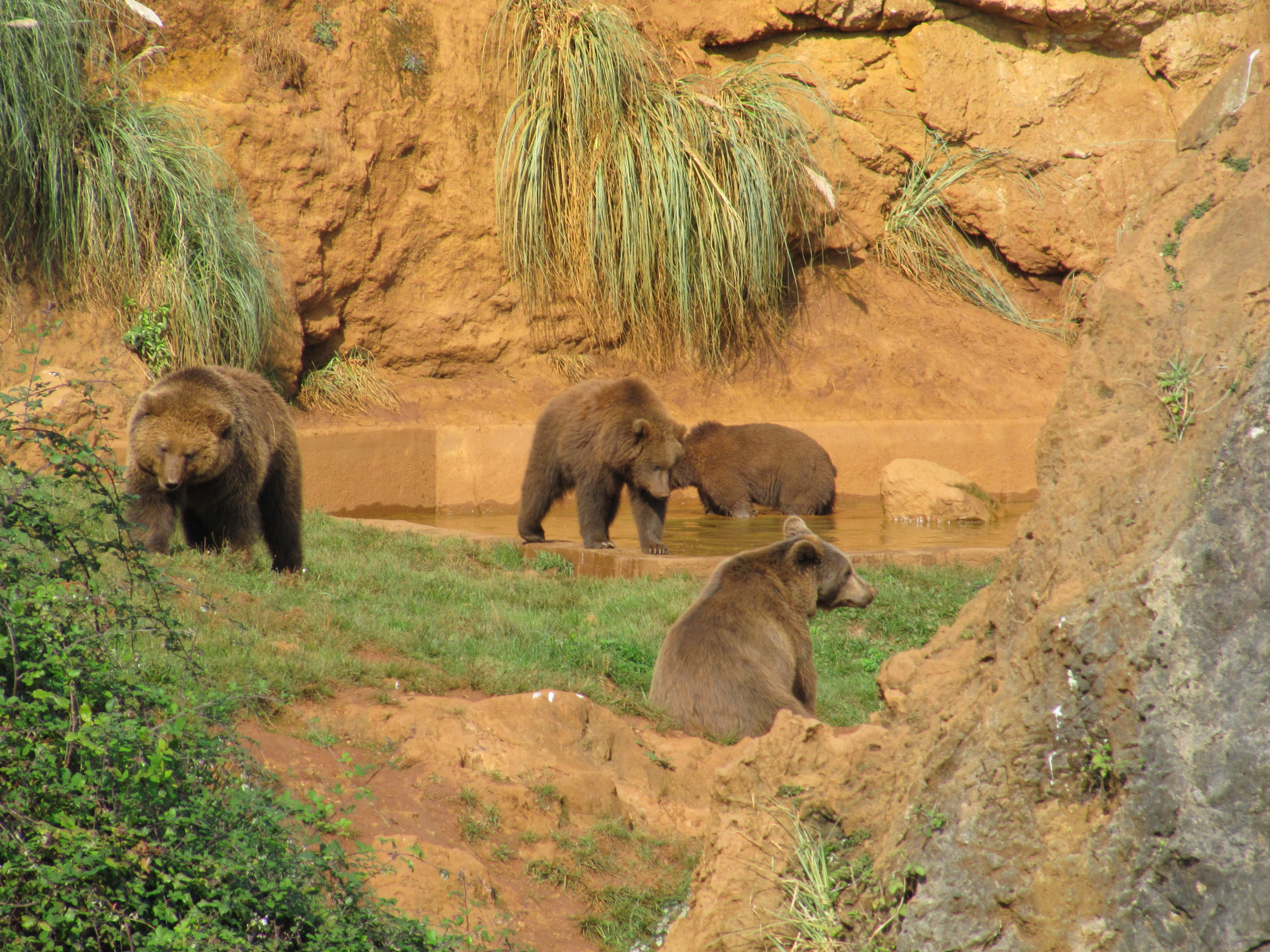
Cantabrian bears in Cabárceno

- La Cabaña is a cafeteria located near the environmental education classroom and has a capacity of 300 guests and a variety of food options.
- La Mina is a cafeteria located next to the reptile house at the main entrance of the park. It has a gift shop and terrace.

== Botanical routes ==
Twenty-four of the 100 trees in the park are grown in some of the park's most visited places: the tiger, hyena, wolf and lion sections.

Botanical paths are located near animal enclosures and display plant species.

- Route of the yews, oaks and hickories

In the gardens, there are: yew, oak, walnut, bamboo, birch, olive, oak, pine, cherry, horse chestnut, alder, holly, cypress, laurels, figs, bananas, strawberry, laurel, oleander, Atlas cedar, ginkgo, ornamental barberry (Bordeaux colour), mock orange, and pittosporum.

- Route of the birch, linden and beech

In the hyena section, there are: birch, olive, cherry, oak (also known as cajiga or Carbayo), chestnut oaks, and elder trees.

In the Lobos section, there are: laurel, willow, oak, lime and beech trees.

- Route of the chestnut and pine

This route features: pines, olive trees, oaks, figs, maples, chestnut pines, maritime pine trees, cherry, medlar, oleander, Pyracantha, cordylines, griñoleras, and more.

== Environmental Education Centre ==
The Environmental Education Centre has educational programs for grade levels between 3 and 18.

== Scientific activity ==
The park has collaborated with the Deutsches Primatenzentrum and the University of Göttingen (Germany) on the development of techniques that have allowed for the study of the sexual cycle of the female African elephant via noninvasive methods (namely the use faeces and urine samples).

The park also collaborates in behavioural studies of the male African elephant via non-invasive methods to further understand the reason for the high aggression, known as Musth, shown by male elephants at certain times of the year.

The park also collaborates with other zoos and partners with animal conservationists in the conservation of endangered species like: tigers, lions, bobcats, rhinos, and more.

The park is a member of IAZA (the Iberian Association of Zoos and Aquaria) and EAZA (the European Association of Zoos and Aquaria), which helps conserve, protect, and restore endangered species threatened by extinction.
