= Cinna (Galatia) =

Town of ancient Galatia

Coordinates: 39°13′37″N 33°01′59″E

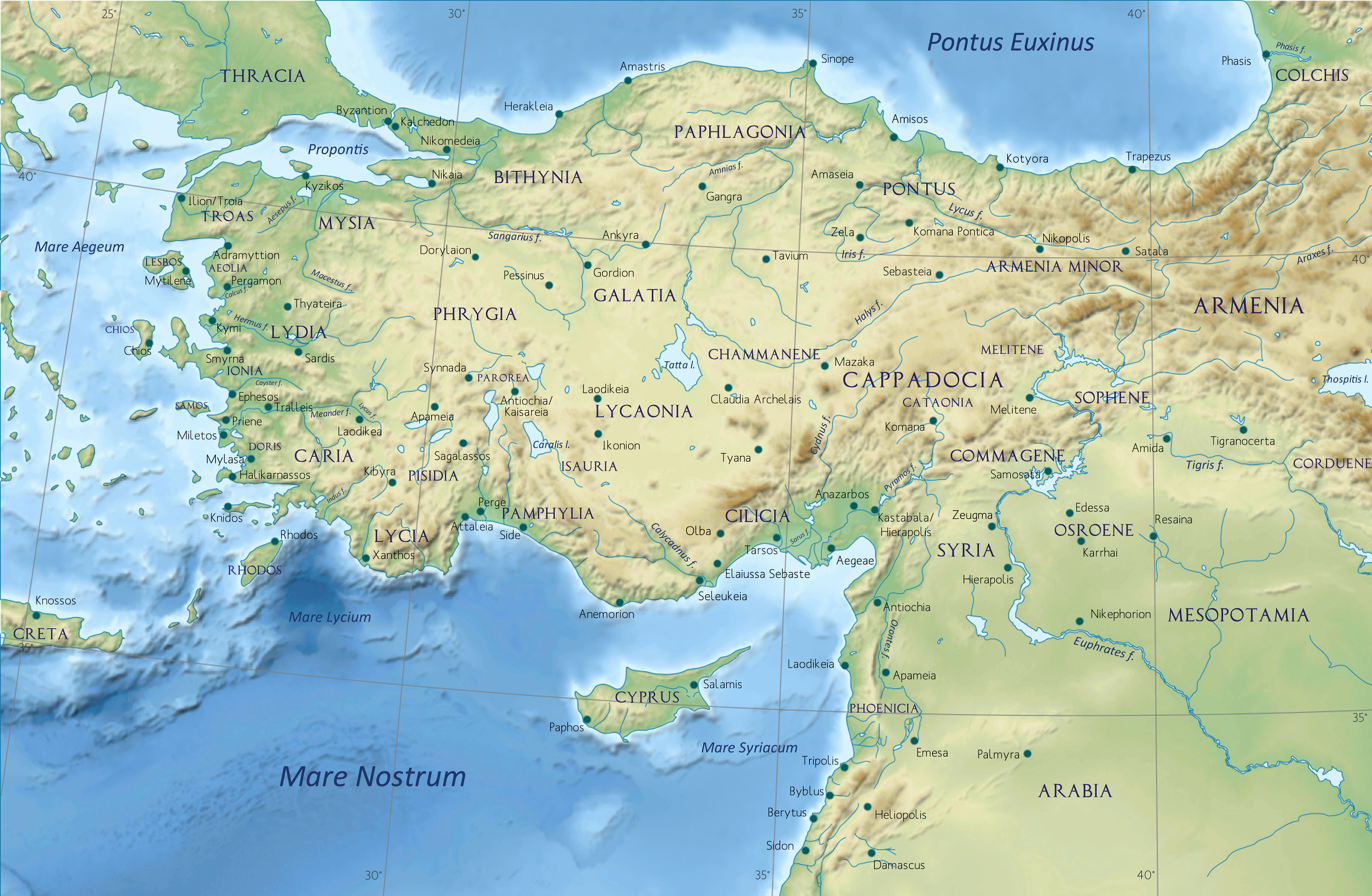
Asia Minor in the Greco-Roman period – general map – regions and main settlements

Cinna or Kinna was a town of ancient Galatia. It was known as Zallara in the Hittite period. It was also the seat of a bishop; no longer a residential see, it remains a titular see of the Roman Catholic Church.

== Location ==
Its site is located near Karahamzılı, Asiatic Turkey. The exact location of Cinna is now lost though it is thought to have been near village of Balyk Koyounji (vilayet of Angora) in a rich corn-growing area, west of Ankara. It is also thought to be in the locations of Cihanbeyli or Kulu.

== History ==
During the Late Roman Empire the town was a seat of a bishop, several of whom are known to us.

- Gregorius, attendee at Council of Niceae 325
- Philumenus of Cinna
- Acacius
- Daniel
- Amiantus
- Plato
- George
- Synesius
- Thrasius
- Antonius
