= Miguel Canela Lázaro =

Dominican conservationist and diplomat

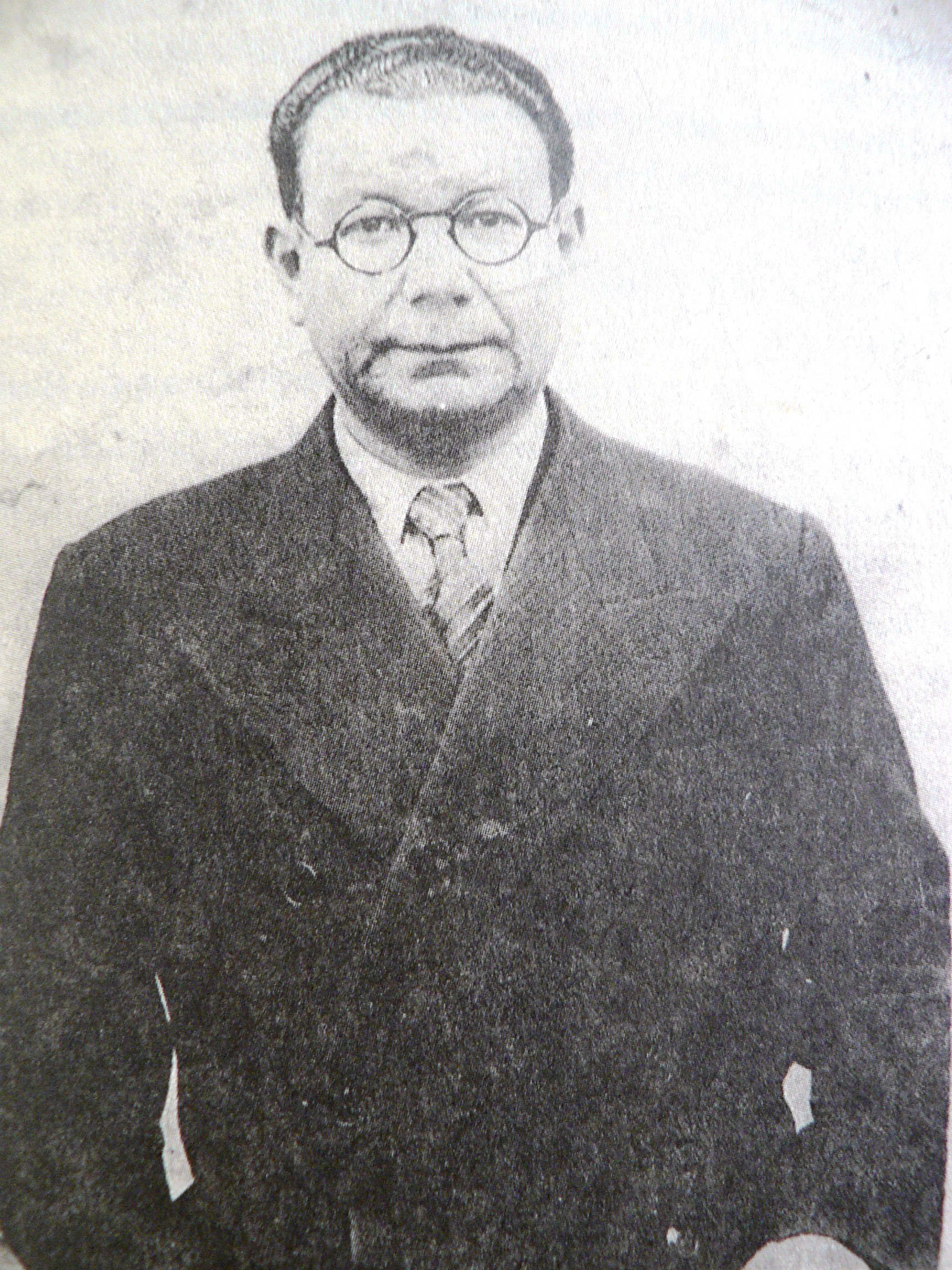
Miguel canela lazaro

Miguel Canela Lázaro (September 29, 1894 – December 1, 1977) was a Dominican medical doctor, anatomist, conservationist and a diplomat.

== Biography ==
He was born in Santiago de los Caballeros, Dominican Republic, on September 29, 1894, the son of Pedro Canela (also born in Santiago) and Dolores Antonia Lázaro (a Spaniard). He received surveyor (1917) and medicine doctorate (1924) degrees from the University of Santo Domingo. He died in Santo Domingo, Dominican Republic on December 1, 1977.

In 1913, he was appointed director of the main boys' school in Salcedo, the San Lorenzo School. In 1914, he resigned from the position to enroll at the University of Santo Domingo, where he studied mathematics for land surveying for two years and attended engineering courses for one year.

He became a professor of mathematics and natural sciences at the Normal School of Santo Domingo. In 1922, he produced a report providing a detailed account of the state of the Dominican forests in the Central Mountain Range (Cordillera Central) and the importance of their conservation.

After qualifying as a land surveyor, he decided to study medicine in 1921. Once he earned his medical degree, he moved from the Dominican capital to Salcedo and San Francisco de Macorís to practice his new profession, adhering strictly to medical ethics.

In 1926, in collaboration with Dr. Juan Bautista Pérez Rancier, he carried out the surveying and demarcation of the first protected area in the Dominican Republic—the "Vedado del Yaque"—a task completed in 1928. In 1948, he resurveyed the area, which, as of 1951, was renamed J. Armando Bermúdez National Park (Official Gazette No. 7346, November 3, 1951).

== Legacy ==
During his stay in Paris in the 1930s, he worked in the Anatomy Laboratory of the Faculty of Medicine at the University of Paris (now Paris V, René Descartes University), directed by the French anatomist Professor Dr. Henri Rouvière (1876–1952), and was appointed as an *Assistant Étranger* (foreign assistant) to Rouvière. As his student, he conducted research on the ligaments of the tibiotalar and posterior talocalcaneal joints (the ankle). Following a thorough study, he concluded that he had discovered a ligament never before mentioned in anatomy textbooks—the fibulotalocalcaneal ligament—which he named the "Rouvière ligament." However, his French mentor, in recognition of the work performed by his Dominican student, designated it the "Canela-Rouvière ligament" (though in Rouvière’s own anatomy textbook, it appears as the "Rouvière-Canela ligament").

Given its great significance, this discovery was widely disseminated and documented in the *Annales d’Anatomie Pathologique et d’Anatomie Normale Médico-Chirurgicale*, a journal published by Masson et Cie (Rouvière H, Canela M: *Le ligament péronéo-astragalo-calcanéen*. Ann Anat Pathol 1932; (9): 745–50).

The Rouvière and Canela ligament (shown in Fig. 15 of "Anatomy of the ankle ligaments: a pictorial essay") is named after him and his supervisor at the University of Paris, Henri Rouvière, for their joint work.

Sent to Germany by Rouvière, Canela conducted studies on the pelvic lymphatic system. He built upon existing German research, refining it further. He presented his findings in Berlin, demonstrating that lymphatic connections and chains extended beyond what had been documented up to that point.

The impact of his research led to an offer in France of the title *Homme de Science* ("Man of Science"); however, Canela declined, as accepting it would have required him to become a French citizen and renounce his Dominican citizenship.

While serving as the doctoral thesis supervisor for Manoutchehr Hakim (d. 1981) in Paris—for the work *Recherches sur l'articulation sacro-iliaque chez l'homme et chez les anthropoïdes* (1937), later published in *Annales d'anatomie pathologique et d'anatomie normale médico-chirurgicale*—Canela discovered a structure within the sacroiliac joint: the superficial ilio-articular bundle of the posterior sacroiliac ligament, now known by the eponym "Hakim-Canela".

Acting on behalf of and representing the Dominican State and the government of that time, Miguel Canela Lázaro signed the founding charter in Fontainebleau for an organization that brings together governments, public entities, nature conservation organizations, and individuals with a shared commitment to this cause.

On October 5, 1948, the Dominican Republic became one of the first countries in the world to sign the founding charter of what is now known as the World Conservation Union—referred to by the acronym IUCN, as it was originally called the International Union for Conservation of Nature.

He passed away in Santo Domingo on December 1, 1977, at the age of 83, due to cardiac complications.

Today, there is an educational institution named in his honor—the Dr. Miguel Canela Lázaro Scientific High School (Liceo Científico Dr. Miguel Canela Lázaro)—which utilizes the STEAM educational methodology.
