= Cinna (album) =

Mixtape by Cannelle
- Released: 26 June 2026
- Recorded: 2025–2026
- Genres: Electropop; EDM
- Length: 31:45
- Labels: Self-released, ROAM (Worldwide, excluding North and South America)
- Producers: Cannelle; Chicken; Oscar Scheller; Warpstr; Océane; Glasear; Alec Ness; Kayla Reagan; babygh0st; Spencer Light

Singles from Cinna
- 1. "Stereo" Released: 15 May 2026; 2. "Dis-Moi" Released: 6 June 2026; 3. "BB Blue" Released: 26 June 2026; 4. "Sunshine" Released: 17 August 2026

Cinna is the debut mixtape by French singer, producer and model Cannelle, self-released on 26 June 2026. The mixtape runs for 31 minutes features production from Cannelle herself, Chicken, Oscar Scheller, Warpstr, Océane, Glasear, umru and spen_l1ght. Cannelle announced the mixtape on 6 June 2026 with the release of second single from the mixtape, "Dis-Moi", following her back to back performance with American DJ umru.

The album was released alongside the music video for "BB Blue" on 26 June 2026. A European and North American tour to promote the album called 'Cinnatour' was announced on 6 August 2026. On August 17 2026, "Sunshine" was released as the 4th single of the album alongside a music video.

== Composition and lyrics ==
Pitchfork described Cinna as a "collection of blingy, EDM-infused electro-pop bonbons with irreverent attitude and real ambition". The Fader described it as "decidedly forward-thinking about the future of French electropop".

== Critical reception ==
Professional ratings
Review scores
| Source | Rating |
|---|---|
| Pitchfork | 6.9/10 |

Pitchfork praised the album by saying "At its best, the mixtape is youthful, sparkly, and infectious: 'Stereo,' co-produced with new pop queen-maker Oscar Scheller, is a bouncy bloghouse bonbon with found-it-at-the-sample-sale exuberance", but also claimed the album was frontloaded.

== Track listing ==
Cinna track listing
| No. | Title | Writer(s) | Producer(s) | Length |
|---|---|---|---|---|
| 1. | "Restless Dreams" | Cannelle; Warpstr; Océane | Warpstr; Océane | 2:22 |
| 2. | "Stereo" | Cannelle; Oscar Scheller | Oscar Scheller; Cannelle | 2:11 |
| 3. | "Dis-Moi" | Cannelle; Warpstr; Océane; Alec Ness; Kayla Reagan | Warpstr; Océane; Cannelle; Alec Ness; Kayla Reagan | 2:27 |
| 4. | "TtyL" | Cannelle; Warpstr; Océane | Warpstr; Océane | 2:30 |
| 5. | "Sunshine" | Cannelle; Oscar Scheller | Oscar Scheller; Cannelle | 2:45 |
| 6. | "Dollars" | Cannelle; Oscar Scheller | Oscar Scheller | 2:15 |
| 7. | "BB Blue" | Cannelle; Chicken; babygh0st | Chicken; babygh0st | 2:53 |
| 8. | "Idole" | Cannelle; Chicken | Chicken | 2:16 |
| 9. | "Telephone" | Cannelle; Oscar Scheller; Glasear | Oscar Scheller; Glasear | 2:49 |
| 10. | "French Kiss" | Cannelle; Oscar Scheller; Spencer Light | Oscar Scheller; Spencer Light | 2:16 |
| 11. | "22" | Cannelle; Warpstr | Warpstr | 1:58 |
| 12. | "Antenna" | Cannelle; Oscar Scheller | Oscar Scheller | 2:53 |
| 13. | "Hi" | Cannelle; Oscar Scheller | Oscar Scheller | 2:05 |
| Total length: | | | | 31:45 |
