= Canelas, Sanxenxo =

Coordinates: 42°23′27″N 8°50′07″W

Canelas is a coastal place in Sanxenxo, Pontevedra, and a beach which the same name. It owes this name to the great quantity of canes that there exists. As the whole coastal zone of Pontevedra, Canelas has an oceanic climate characterized by abundant rains and soft temperatures. It is protected from the winds of the north, because the place is orientated towards the south. Waves are small enough, but with the arrival of temporary some they increase considerably, managing to be a place for the raw surfers, owed also to the rock absence in the center of the beach. The beach has a length of 400 meters. According to the last IGE, in 2013 it had 54 inhabitants (28 men and 26 women).
