= Giampiero Cannella =

Italian politician (born 1965)

Member of the Chamber of Deputies
- In office 16 December 2011 – 14 March 2013
- Preceded by: Nicolò Cristaldi
- Constituency: Sicily 1
- In office 1 August 2001 – 27 April 2006
- Preceded by: Guido Lo Porto
- Constituency: Sicily 1

Personal details
- Born: 24 June 1965 (age 61)
- Party: Brothers of Italy (since 2012)

Giampiero Cannella (born 24 June 1965) is an Italian politician serving as undersecretary of the Ministry of Culture since 2026. He was a member of the Chamber of Deputies from 2001 to 2006 and from 2011 to 2013. From 2024 to 2026, he served as deputy mayor of Palermo.

== Biography ==
A Palermo-based leader of the FUAN Destra Universitaria, he was appointed by Maurizio Gasparri to the organization’s national leadership. In 1998, he became national vice president and a trainee journalist at Il Secolo d'Italia.

In 2000, he became the national president of Azione Universitaria. As a proportional representation candidate on the AN list in the 2001 general election, he was the highest-ranking unelected candidate, but on August 1, 2001, he became a member of the Chamber of Deputies for National Alliance (Italy) following the resignation of Guido Lo Porto, who had been elected president of the Sicilian Regional Assembly.

After failing to win reelection in 2006, he was appointed city councilor and later deputy mayor of Palermo. He served as the provincial coordinator for AN until 2008. Since 2008, he has once again served as a city councilor for Palermo under Diego Cammarata administration.

He ran for the Chamber of Deputies in 2008 with the PdL and finished first among those not elected. Due to a ruling by the Constitutional court that established the incompatibility of holding the office of member of parliament and mayor of municipalities with more than 20,000 inhabitants, on December 16, 2011, Nicolò Cristaldi resigned from his seat in the Chamber of Deputies to take office as mayor of Mazara del Vallo. On the same day, he was replaced by Cannella, who joined the People of Freedom (PdL) parliamentary group.

He ran in the 2013 general election as the lead candidate for the Chamber of Deputies (Italy) in the Sicily 1 district on the Fratelli d'Italia–National Center-Right ticket, but was not re-elected. In 2013, he founded the online newspaper “Il Sito di Sicilia.” Viene nominato coordinatore di Fratelli d'Italia per la Sicilia occidentale. He was appointed coordinator of Fratelli d'Italia for western Sicily.

He ran as a candidate in a multi-member district for the Chamber of Deputies in the 2018 general election with Brothers of Italy but was not elected. In June 2019, he joined the communications staff of Nello Musumeci, President of the Sicilian Region.

Since 2022, he has served as a city councilor in Palermo, with responsibility for cultural policy, the museum and library system, performing arts and cultural events, and place names. On February 19, 2024, he was appointed deputy mayor of Palermo, replacing Carolina Varchi.

On April 22, 2026, the Council of Ministers appointed Cannella as the new undersecretary of state at the Ministry of Culture, replacing Gianmarco Mazzi, who was promoted to the position of Minister of Tourism.
