= Cannelle (singer) =

- Cannelle performing in Berlin in September 2026

Background information
- Born: Cannelle Ferragu; 6 August 2003; Aix-en-Provence, France
- Genres: Edm; Electropop
- Occupations: Music producer; Songwriter; Model
- Years active: 2024-present
- Label: ROAM

Cannelle Ferragu (born 6 August 2003), known mononymously as Cannelle, is a French singer, producer, songwriter and model. Her music, released in both French and English, has been described as "EDM infused electropop".

== Life and Career ==
Cannelle Ferragu was born 6 August 2003 in Aix-en-Provence, France. Cannelle started her career as a model, debuting on the Vaquera runway in 2022 and later working with multiple notable brands and appearing in high fashion editorials. In 2024, she began releasing music through a series of singles, including Clover, Fille, Diamond CUts and MP3.

In 2026, Cannelle rose to prominence through multiple live performances, notably opening for Australian DJ Ninajirachi on the American leg of her "I Love My Computer And It Loves Me" tour and a back to back performance with American Musician umru. Following the latter, she announced her debut mixtape, titled 'Cinna'. She released it on 26 June 2026, led by the singles Stereo, Dis-Moi and BB Blue. Cannelle is now based mostly in Los Angeles, California. A European and North American tour to promote the album was announced on 6 August 2026.
