= Canyelles (town) =

- Municipality
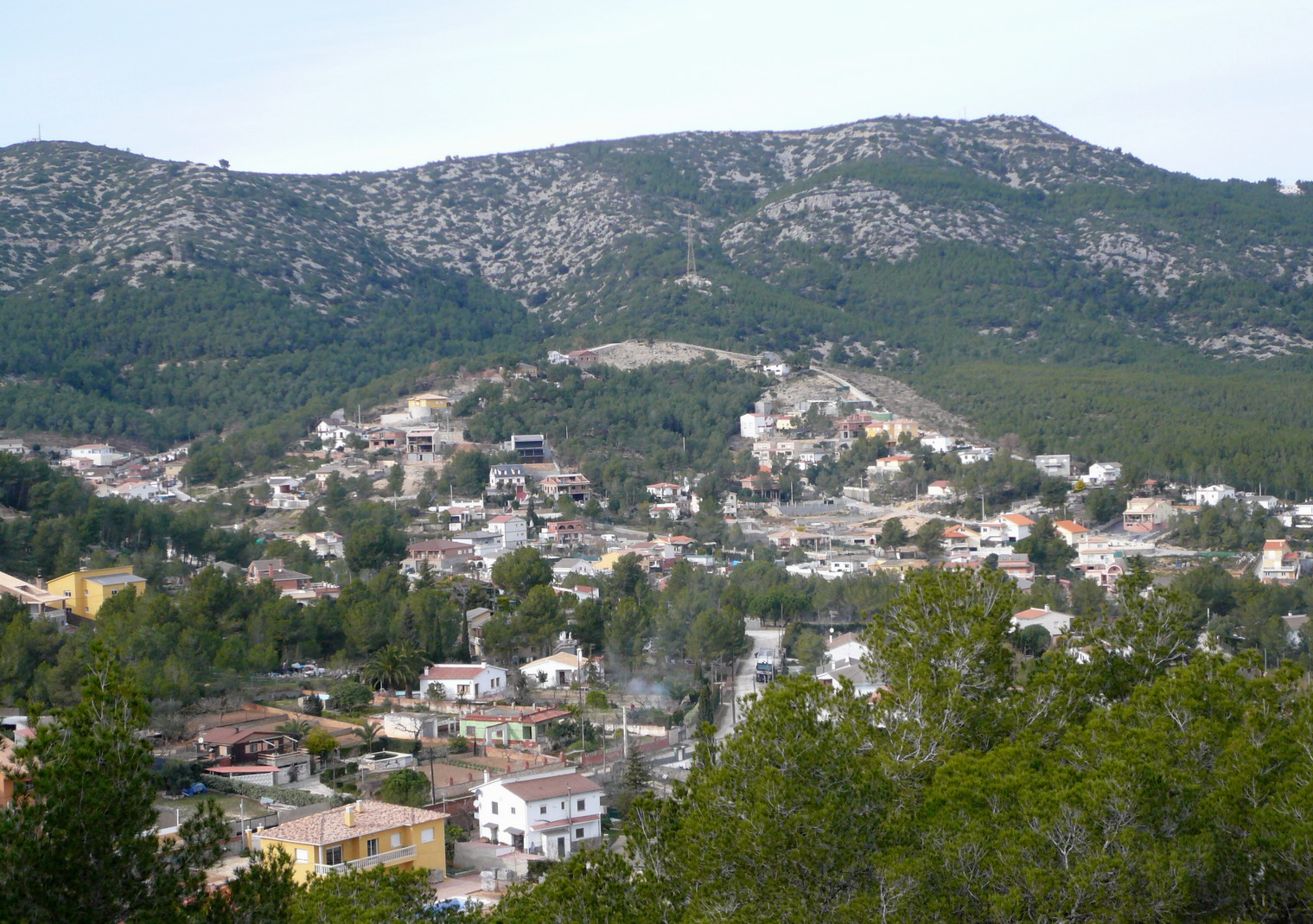

- Flag Coat of arms

- Location in Catalonia Canyelles (Spain)
- Coordinates: 41°17′18″N 1°43′23″E
- Country: Spain
- Community: Catalonia
- Province: Barcelona
- Comarca: Garraf

Government
  - Mayor: Rosa Huguet Sugranyes (2015)

Area
  - Total: 14.2 km^{2} (5.5 sq mi)
- Elevation: 142 m (466 ft)

Population (2025-01-01)
  - Total: 5,505
  - Density: 388/km^{2} (1,000/sq mi)
- Demonym: Canyellenc
- Website: canyelles.cat

Canyelles (Catalan pronunciation: [kəˈɲeʎəs]) is a town in the northeast of the Garraf comarca (county) in the south of Barcelona province, Catalonia, Spain. It is home to a 15th-century castle.

== Culture ==
Main festivals include:

- Xatonada Popular
- Festa Major de Canyelles (July 22)
- Petita Festa Major (September 10)
- Fira de Santa Llúcia (1st Sunday in December)
