= International Association for Bear Research and Management =

Wildlife conservation organization

The International Association for Bear Research and Management (IBA), sometimes shortened to International Bear Association, is a professional organization for biologists, wildlife managers and others which focuses on wildlife conservation of the eight species of bear. The organization has over 700 members in over 50 countries. IBA's focuses are scientific management of bears, research, distribution of information, and international conferences on bear biology, ecology and management. Follow IBA on Instagram, Facebook, Bluesky, and YouTube.

IBA's mission is to advance scientific understanding and global conservation of the world's eight bear species

IBA's vision is that of a world where all eight bear species can thrive and coexist with humans.

== Council ==
IBA is governed by an elected council of President, Past President, Vice-President Americas, Vice-President Eurasia, Secretary, Treasurer, and 5 Councillors. Each member of council serves a 3-year term, but elections for offices are staggered to ensure continuity of institutional knowledge among successive councils. In one election cycle voting is for President, Vice-President Americas, Treasurer and two councillor positions. In the subsequent election cycle, a year later, voting is for Secretaty, Vice-President Eurasia and three councillor positions. Per the By-laws, Council may appoint an additional councillor to improve geographic representation of council members.

IBA's full time Executive Director manages day-to-day IBA business, including financial transactions and communication with members. A part-time social media position handles IBA's social media presence.

== Committees ==
Committees support various parts of IBA's mission. The IBA's Management Committee addresses bear management and conservation issues across North America. The Management Committee publishes educational materials including the Managers' Corner in International Bear News. The IBA's Management Committee also publishes webinars on various topics on the IBA's YouTube channel, YouTube

The IBA has additional committees that administer its various grants programs that support bear conservation and research and exchange programs among researchers and managers: the Research and Conservation Grants Committee and the Experience and Exchange Grants Committee. The Conference Committee provides advice and assistance to those planning to host an IBA conference, and the Travel Grants Committee provides support to students and early career researchers to attend IBA's international conferences.

== Conferences ==
The IBA typically hosts at least one conference in the Americas and at least one in Eurasia every three years. The first conference was held during August 1968 in Whitehorse, Yukon Territory, Canada. The IBA aims to hold conferences in venues where the conference can highlight and call attention to the status of bears in that area. Actual timing of conferences depends in part on local weather, demands of field work, and reducing costs by holding conferences during shoulder or off-season dates. Recent conferences include the 20th in Ottawa, Canada, July 2011; New Delhi, India, November 2012; Provo, USA, September 2013; Thessaloniki, Greece, October, 2014; Anchorage, USA, June 2016; Quito, Ecuador, November 2017; Ljubljana, Slovenia, September, 2018; Kalispell, USA, September, 2021; and Edmonton, Canada, September 2024. The most recent conference, the 29th, was held in Pescasseroli, Italy from 20-25 September 2026. The next IBA next conference will be held in Belgrade, Serbia in September 2029.

== Publications ==
The IBA publishes peer-reviewed manuscripts in its online scientific journal Ursus which, as of 2026, is fully open access. Prior to Ursus, conference proceedings included invited papers and papers presented at conferences published as Bears: Their Biology and Management and later International Conference on Bear Research and Management. The journal's name was changed to Ursus in 1998 and began accepting open submissions in 1999.

The IBA partners with the Bear Specialist Group (BSG), of the World Conservation Union (IUCN) and its Species Survival Commission, to publish the newsletter International Bear News three times per year.

== See also ==
- Bear conservation
