= Cannelle (bear) =

Last representative of a population of bears in the Pyrenees

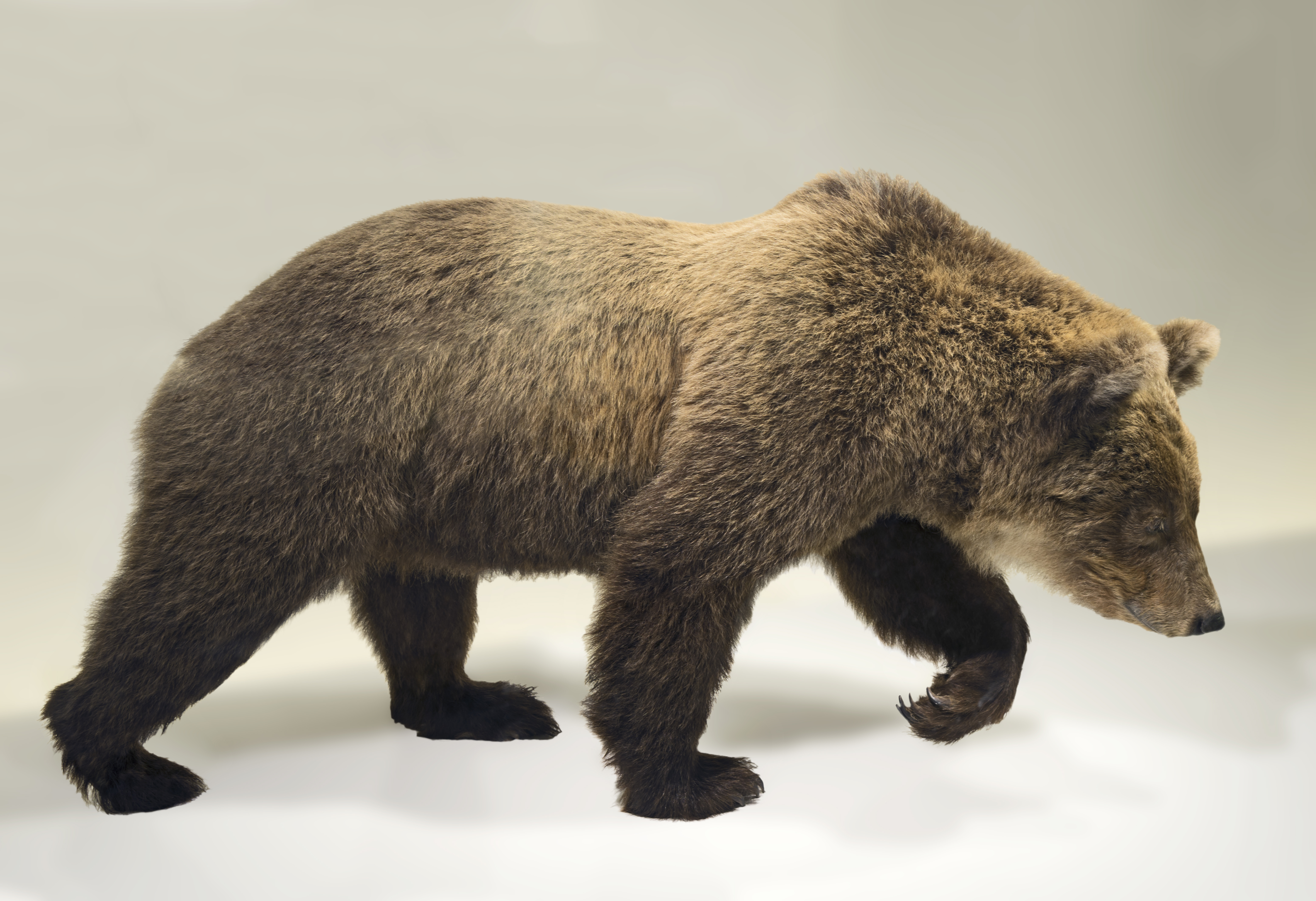
Image of a Cannelle

Cannelle was the last representative of a population of bears in the Pyrenees. She was killed on 1 November 2004 by a hunter, René Marquèze. Her cub, Cannellito, eight months old at the time of his mother's death, survived. Despite this fact, she was the last representative of the pure Pyrenean lineage of Ursus arctos, and her death caused a wave of indignation in France, prompting the government to launch a second introduction of Slovenian bears in the Pyrenees in 2006.

== Measurements ==
Cannelle measured 2.28 m (7.5 ft) in length and 0.72 m (2.4 ft) in height, with a weight of 95 kg (209 lb).

== Death ==
Cannelle's presence was reported in the Aspe Valley where she was filmed on 26 August 2004 with her cub Cannellito, by Didier Melet, forest ranger of the Pyrénées National Park.

On 1 November 2004, a group of six hunters went for a wild boar hunt on the heights of Urdos, in the sector of the Col du Couret called "Pas de l’Ours" where plantigrades had been reported to them. One of the hunters, Francis Claverie, saw Cannelle approaching and fired above her to scare her away. Another hunter, René Marquèze, was pushed by the bear towards a ravine. According to his statements, he shot Cannelle when cornered at the edge of the cliff: the bear, killed, fell into the ravine where her body was recovered by a gendarmerie helicopter. According to bear protection associations, Cannelle would have made a "mock charge", while for bear opponents, René Marquèze would have shot in a situation of self-defense. The autopsy revealed that the bullet entered the upper part of the right thoracic side, broke ribs, and exited at the upper part of the left hind limb. Experts, however, could not determine the distance between the shooter and Cannelle. The hunter reportedly cried after shooting the bear.

Cannelle's death sparked widespread emotion. The President of the Republic, Jacques Chirac, lamented "a great loss for biodiversity in France and in Europe". Her death prompted the public authorities to carry out a second introduction of Slovenian bears in the Pyrenees in 2006.

== Trial for destruction of a protected species ==
Charged with the destruction of a protected species, René Marquèze, aged 71 years, was initially granted a dismissal on 19 January 2007, having pleaded state of necessity. The State and nineteen environmental associations, which had joined as civil parties against him, appealed the judgment, and on 6 April 2007, the Court of Appeal of Pau annulled the dismissal and ordered the case to be sent to the correctional court.

René Marquèze was acquitted by the correctional tribunal of Pau on 21 April 2008. In its ruling, the court confirmed the state of necessity and upheld the state of self-defense, finding that the Urdos hunters could not be held responsible for Cannelle's death, as the decision to ban hunting in this area fell to the authorities. The accused was therefore acquitted of "destruction of a protected species." The court having absolved him of all criminal responsibility for the animal's death, several environmental protection organizations pursued him in civil court and sought damages and interest.

The Pau Court of Appeal sentenced him on 11 September 2009 to pay a total of 11,000 euros to seven of the eight civil parties. On 1 June 2010, the Court of Cassation, which examined the hunter's appeal, ordered him to pay 10,000 euros to seven environmental protection organizations.

The court reproached him for having participated in the hunt after being warned of the bear's presence, then for leaving the terrace where he had taken refuge while help was arriving

In May 2013, the hunting association of which he was a member was ordered to pay 53,000 euros to the WWF for the moral damage suffered by this nature protection association.

== Cannellito ==
After Cannelle's death, her orphaned cub Cannellito wandered alone in the Aspe Valley. From September 2004 to April 2005, it was seen several times and filmed by Didier Melet, forest ranger of the Pyrenees National Park. The cub, now aged 21 years, weighing around 40 kg (88 lb), was still dependent on its mother at the time of the tragedy. It is then taken in charge by bear protection associations. Observed in December 2005, he weighed around 100 kg (220 lb). According to bear protection associations, he joined a group of bears that settled in the Osse Valley where they hibernate together. However, according to bear opponents, he stayed in the Aspe Valley in early 2006 and hibernated in the forest.

Since 2010, Cannellito has only been detected by DNA samples. He reappeared in the Central Pyrenees in the summer of 2011: he was identified by genetic analysis of hair and excrement collected on 20 September 2011 in the Haute-Garonne department, between Aspet and Luchon. In 2014, he weighed 140 kg (310 lb). However, unlike other bears born in the Pyrenees, he has not been observed forming a pair with a female.

== See also ==
- Brown bear
