= S100 =

S100 or S-100 may refer to:

== Aviation ==
- Colyaer Freedom S100, a Spanish amphibious ultralight aircraft
- Colyaer Gannet S100, a Spanish ultralight flying boat
- Colyaer Martin3 S100 is a Spanish ultralight aircraft
- Schiebel Camcopter S-100, an unmanned aerial vehicle

== Consumer electronics ==
- Canon PowerShot S100, a digital camera
- Guild S-100, an electric guitar
- Lenovo IdeaPad S100, a netbook computer
- Qtek S100, a mobile phone

== Trains ==
- Renfe Class 100, or S100, a high speed train
- USATC S100 Class, a 1942 steam locomotive class

== Other ==
- S-100 bus, an early computer bus
- S-100, an International Hydrographic Organization standard
- S100 protein, low-molecular-weight proteins in vertebrates
- The road number used in the Netherlands for inner-city ring roads
- A class of World War II German E-boat.
- Škoda 100, a 1970s car
