= Road transport in the Netherlands =

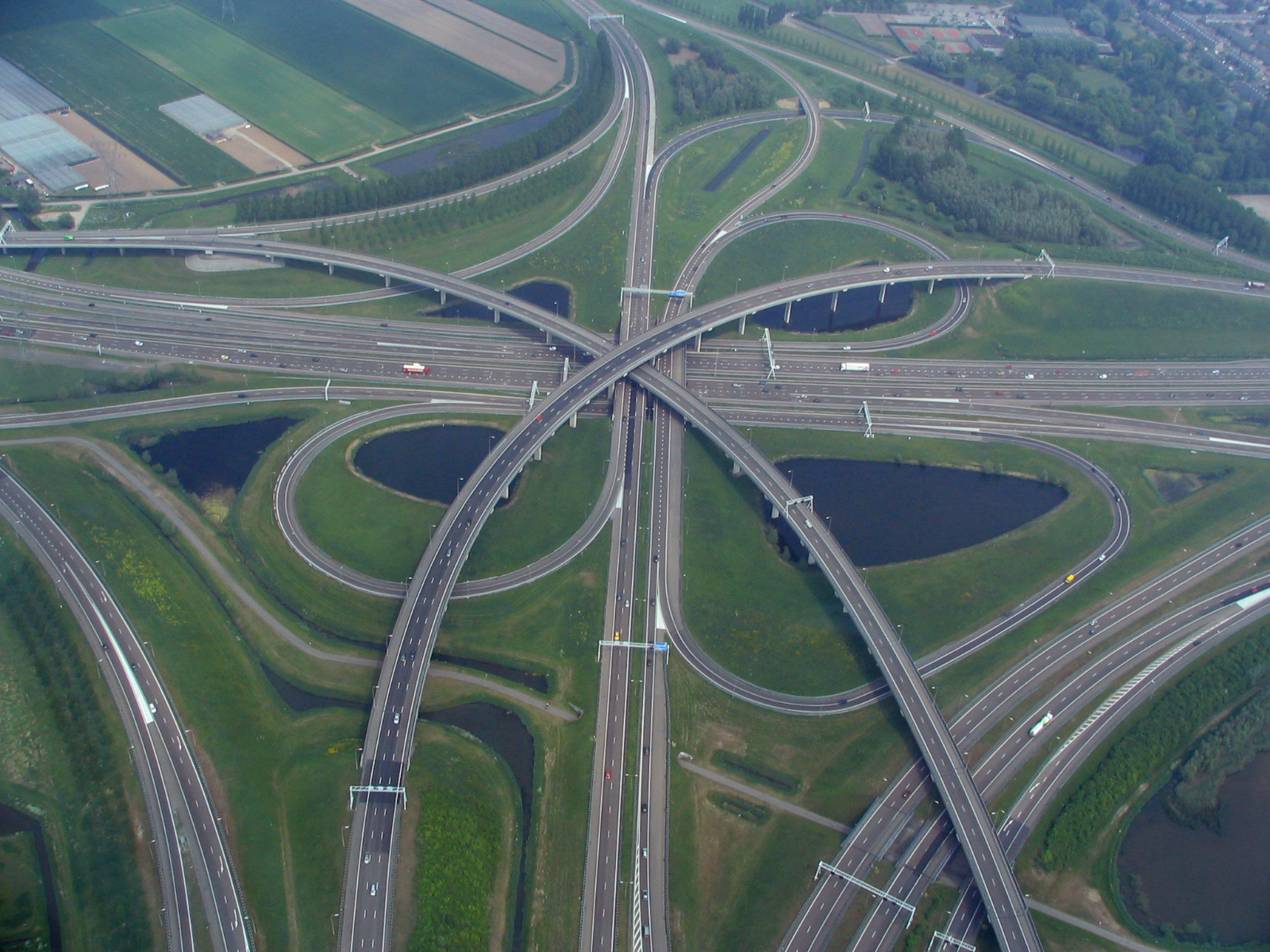
The Ridderkerk interchange, where motorways A15 and A16 cross

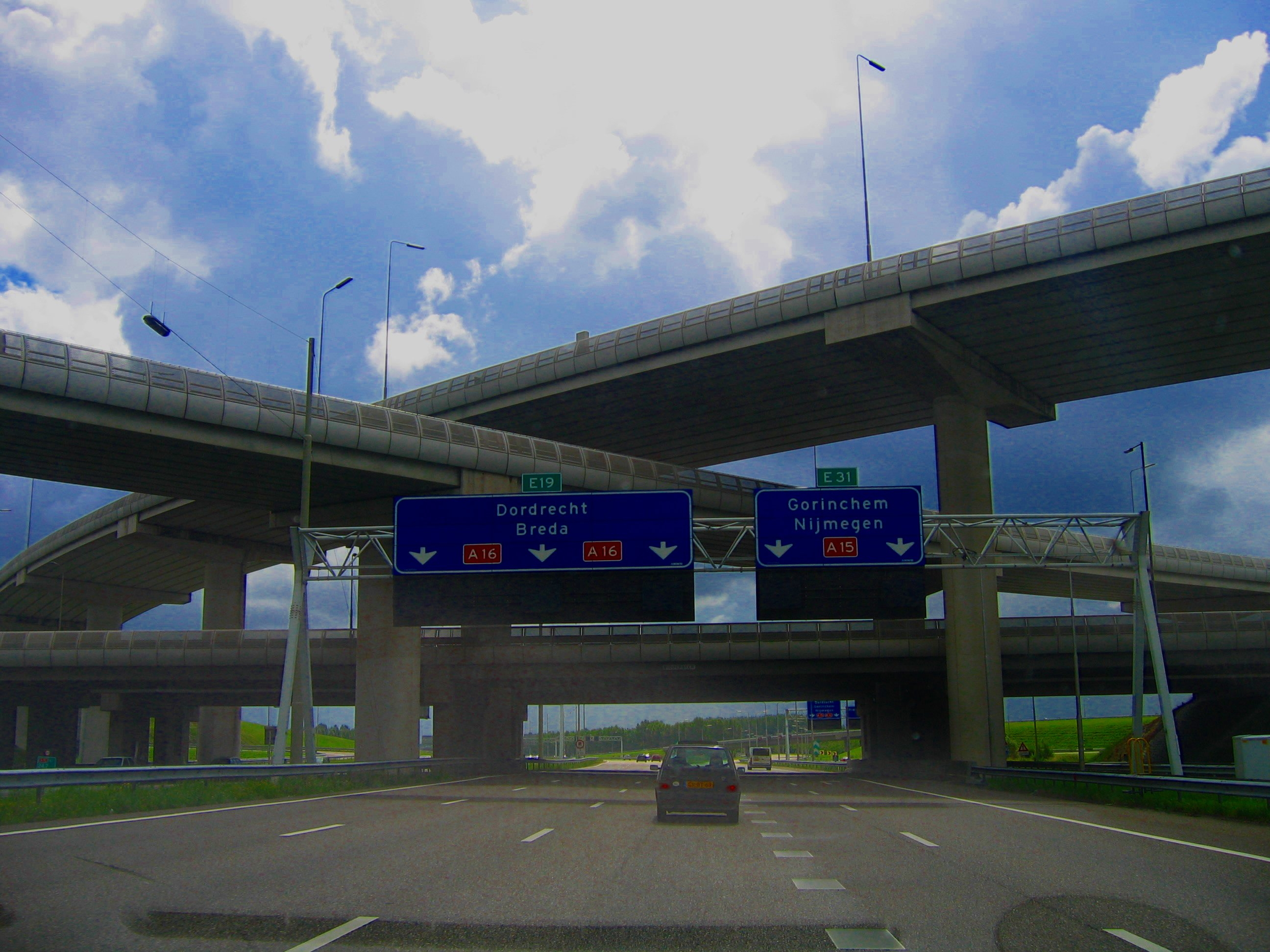
Motorway A15 / A16 from up close

With 139,000 km (86,400 miles) of public roads, the Netherlands has one of the most dense road networks in the world – much denser than Germany and France, but still not as dense as Belgium. (Note: Japan has the same per country road density, but the Netherlands' area includes 18.4% water, compared to 0.8% for Japan.) In 2013, 5,191 km (3225 miles) were national roads, 7,778 km (4833 miles) were provincial roads, and 125,230 km (77,815 miles) were municipality and other roads. Dutch roads include 3,530 km (2193 miles) of motorways and expressways, and with a motorway density of 64 kilometres per 1,000 km^{2} (103 miles per 1000 sq. mi.), the country also has one of the densest motorway networks in the world. In Dutch a motorway is called "autosnelweg" or simply "snelweg"; other expressways are just called "autoweg" (literally: "car road"). According to a 2004 estimate, some 12,500 km (7770 miles) of road remain as yet unpaved.

Mobility on Dutch roads has grown continuously since the 1950s and now exceeds 200 billion km (100,000 million miles) travelled per year. With a population of 16.8 million people, this comes down to an average of 32 kilometres (20 mi) per person per day. Around half of all trips in the Netherlands are made by car, making up three-quarters of all passenger kilometres (miles) travelled, meaning that while Dutch roads are numerous, they are also used with one of the highest intensities of any road network. Car ownership in the Netherlands is high but not exceptional, and slightly lower than in surrounding countries. Goods vehicles make up 20% of total traffic, and road transport accounts for 40% of all freight movements registered, including overseas shipping.

The busiest Dutch motorway is the A13 between The Hague and Rotterdam, with a traffic volume of 140,000 motor vehicles per day. The province of Utrecht in the centre of the country however, has the busiest motorways on average (almost 100,000 vehicles a day), with major motorways A1, A2, A12, A27 and A28 running through it. The busiest 4-lane motorway in the Netherlands is the A10 in the Coen Tunnel in Amsterdam with 110.000 vehicles per day. The widest Dutch motorway is the A15/A16 just south of Rotterdam with 16 lanes in a 4+4+4+4 setup.

== History ==
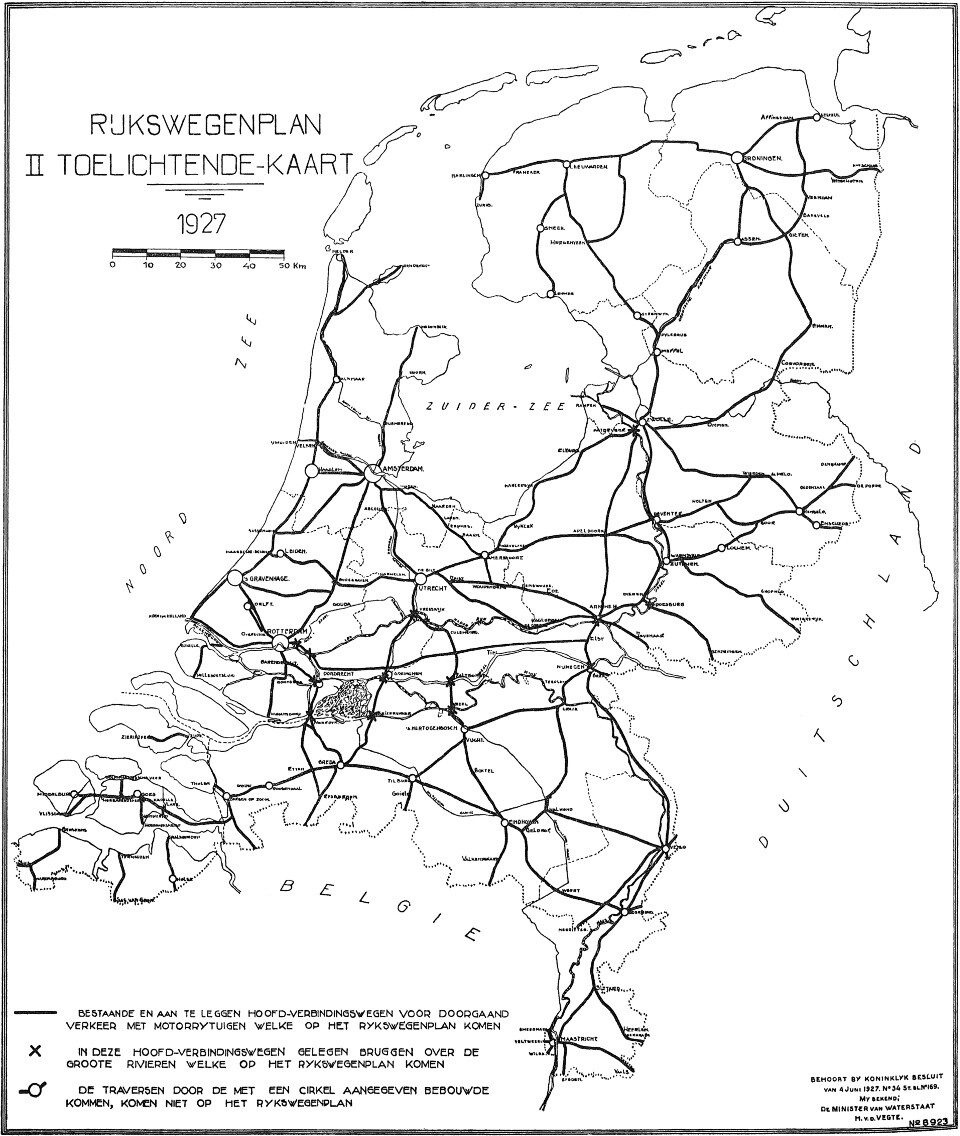
The 1927 Rijkswegenplan was the first Dutch national highway structure plan for a century

The Netherlands' first centrally planned highway system dates back to the early 19th century, when Napoleon was emperor of France, and the Kingdom of Holland was annexed into the French empire. In 1811 Napoleon decreed that a network of 229 paved imperial roads (Routes Impériales) would be created, extending from Paris to the borders of his empire. In addition to systematic paving, the roads were all numbered, an innovation at the time. Construction of several imperial highways through the Netherlands commenced. Amsterdam was connected to Paris by Route Impériale no. 2 – a section between Amsterdam and Utrecht is today still a part of the A2 motorway.

After the liberation in 1813, the Netherlands' new king continued the project, but with Amsterdam at the centre. The plan was expanded several times. In 1821 it projected 42 Rijksstraatwegen (literally: "National paved roads"), which were built up to 1850. Since 1927 this network was transformed into today's system of Rijkswegen (national highways) in the Netherlands.

The first motorway dates back to 1936, when the current A12 was opened to traffic between Voorburg and Zoetermeer, near The Hague. Motorway construction accelerated in the 1960s and 1970s, but halted in the 1980s. Current motorway expansion mostly occurs outside the Randstad, and very little construction has taken place inside the Randstad since the 1980s. Since 1991, only 100 kilometers (60 miles) of motorway have been constructed in the entire country, of which only 26 km (16 miles) lie within the Randstad metropolitan area. The population has grown by 1.5 million since, creating significant pressure on the motorway network. Nevertheless, the growth in Dutch mobility during the last sixty years has been almost entirely through the use of motor vehicles.

== Road safety ==
Judging by annual road fatalities, traffic in the Netherlands can be considered moderately safe, with only 4.5 deaths per 1 billion vehicle-kilometres (60,000 million vehicle miles) per year, 3.4 road fatalities per 100,000 inhabitants or 6.0 fatalities per 100,000 motor vehicles per year. In each respect this places the country's traffic in the top ten of the world for road safety, as far as data is available. Non-lethal traffic casualties however are showing a different picture. From year 2000 through 2007 around 16,000 people annually were seriously injured in Dutch road traffic; and numbers rose to more than 20,000 seriously injured in 2011. Half of all seriously injured are cyclists. The Dutch government and societal organisations are aiming to reduce fatalities to 500, and serious injuries to 10,000 by year 2020.

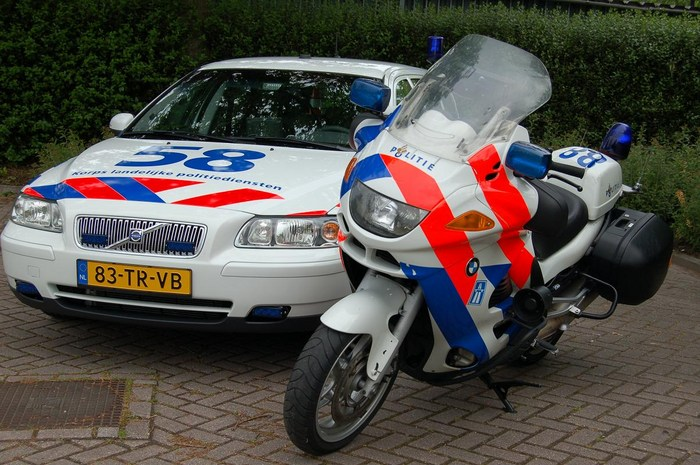
Vehicles of the Dutch national highway police

Contrary to North America, mass motorisation in Europe mostly took off after World War II, and traffic deaths in the Netherlands rose steadily since the 1950s, peaking at 3,267 in 1972. This led to a protest movement in the 1970s called Stop de Kindermoord (Dutch for "Stop the Child Murder") against the increasing number of children killed in traffic collisions as a consequence of the growing car dependency of Amsterdam and other Dutch cities.

From then onwards road safety was consistently improved, reducing fatalities by 83% compared to 1972, to a record low of 570 in 2013 and 2014. However, in 2015, for the first time since 1973, Dutch road fatalities increased by almost 9% to 621 deaths.

General maximum speed limits were introduced in 1957 (50 km/h; 30 mph within built-up areas), and in 1973 (100 km/h; 60 mph on extra-urban highways); the motorway limit was later raised to 120 km/h (75 mph) in 1988, and subsequently to 130 km/h (80 mph) in 2012. However, since 16 March 2020, the motorway limit has been reduced to a time bound limit. From 6 o'clock in the morning till 7 o'clock in the evening, the motorway limit is 100 km/h (60 mph). From 7 o'clock in the evening till 6 o'clock in the morning, it is possible to speed till 130 km/h (80 mph) on motorways containing traffic signs which permit that timed limit.

== Status and technology ==
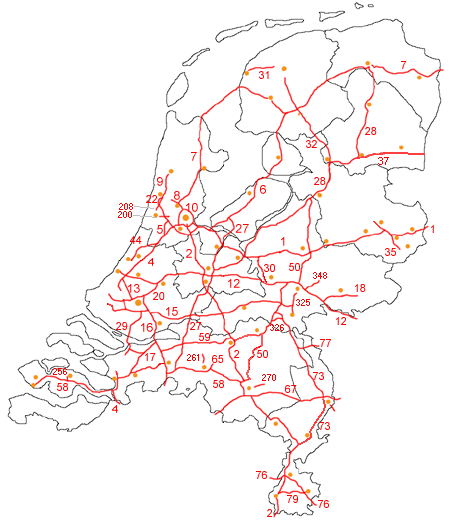
Motorways in the Netherlands

The Netherlands has one of the most advanced motorway networks in the world, with Variable Message Signs and electronic signalization across most of the network. A special feature of the motorways is the use of Porous Asphalt Concrete, which allows water to be drained efficiently, and even in heavy rain, no water will splash up, in contrast with concrete or other pavement types. The Netherlands is the only country which uses PAC this extensively, and the goal is to cover 100% of the motorways with PAC. Porous Asphalt Concrete has some downsides, including the initial construction costs, PAC is two to three times more expensive than regular surface materials, and needs constant maintenance, especially with heavy traffic. Sometimes, the road surface has to be renewed within 7 years, especially on routes with heavy truck traffic causing widespread track formation.

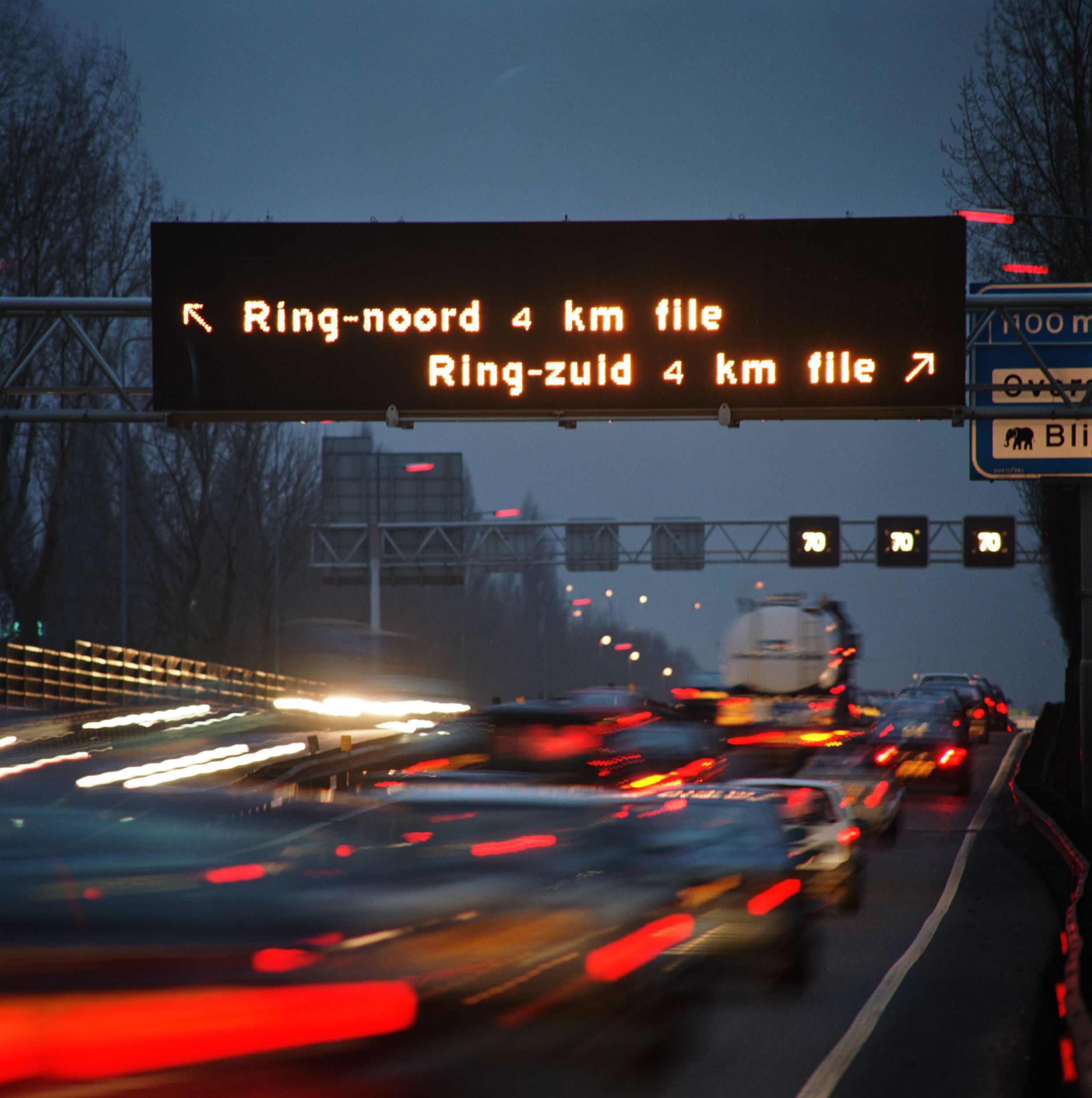
Dynamic Route Information Panel (DRIP) on the A13

In 1979, the first traffic control center opened in Delft, where the A13 can be controlled with dynamic road signalization. These electronic signs can show a lower speed limit, as low as 50 km/h (30 mph), to warn drivers for upcoming traffic jams and accidents. They usually also contain flashers to attract attention from drivers. The expansion of this system halted in the 1980s, but accelerated again in the 1990s. As of 2004, 980 kilometers (600 miles) of motorways are fitted with electronic traffic signalization. Besides this system, another system of Variable Message Signs (VMS) has been implemented, informing motorists about the driving times or traffic jam length to a certain point. It can also show the length of various traffic jams near large interchanges, so drivers can choose an alternative route. As of 2004, there were 102 VMS signs in the Netherlands. The number of passing motorised vehicles is counted every minute of the day at some 20,000 measuring stations on the Dutch motorway network.

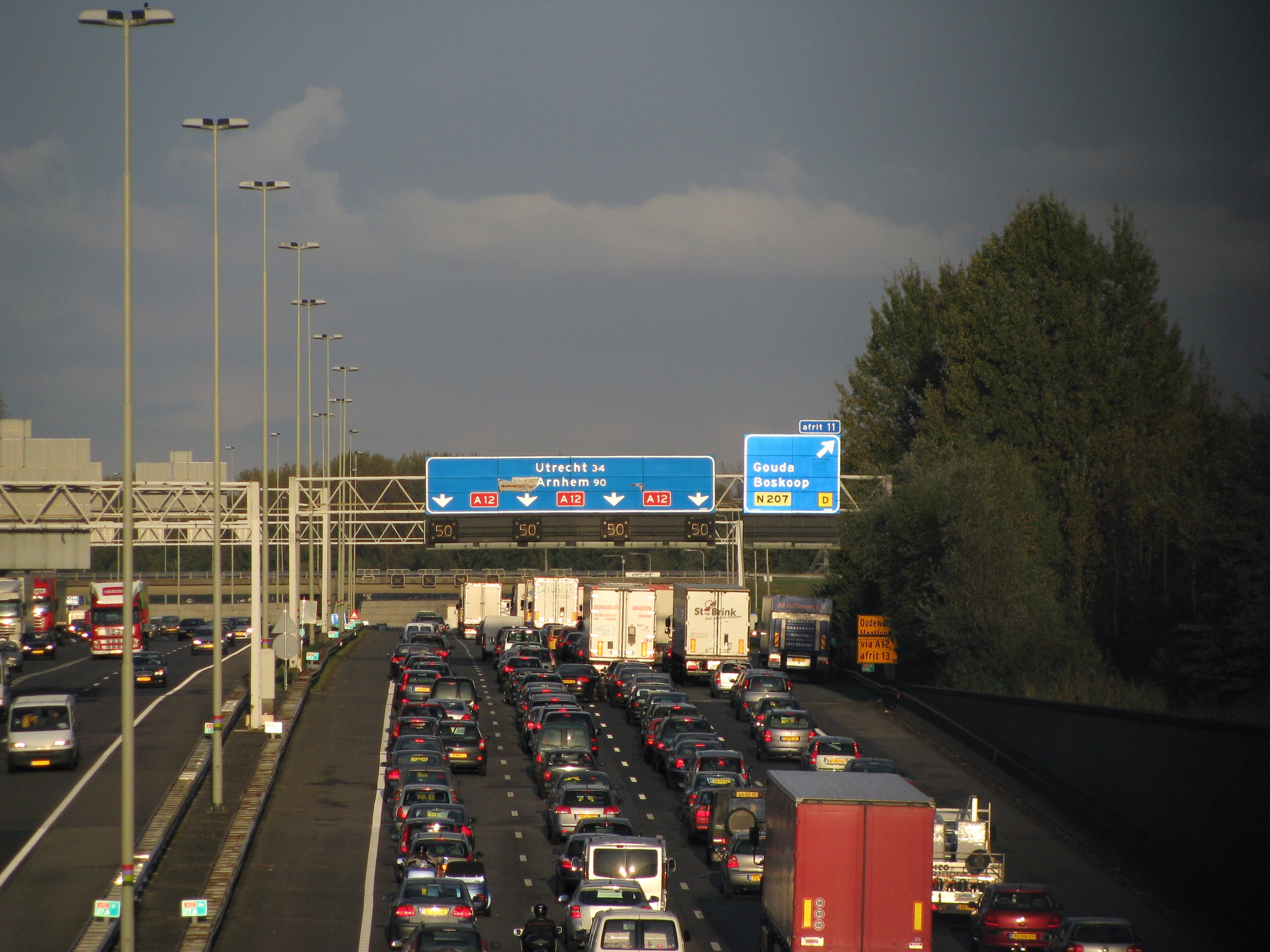
Evening rush hour (A12 at Gouda)

Another more common feature of Dutch motorways are peak, rushhour or plus lanes. These constructions allow motorists to use the hard shoulder in case of congestion, to improve the traffic flow. Numerous motorways have peak lanes, and plus lanes are extra lanes in the median, which can be opened to traffic in case of congestion. All these extra lanes are observed by CCTV cameras from a traffic control center. They improved traffic flow, breakdowns, there are fewer places to safely park your vehicle, leading to more congestion. It has been suggested that these peak lanes should eventually be replaced by a regular widening.

The Dutch government initiated a plan to establish over 200 recharging stations for electric vehicles across the country by 2015. The rollout will be undertaken by Switzerland-based power and automation company ABB and Dutch startup Fastned, and will aim to provide at least one station every 50 kilometres (31 miles) for the Netherlands' 17 million residents.

== Congestion ==
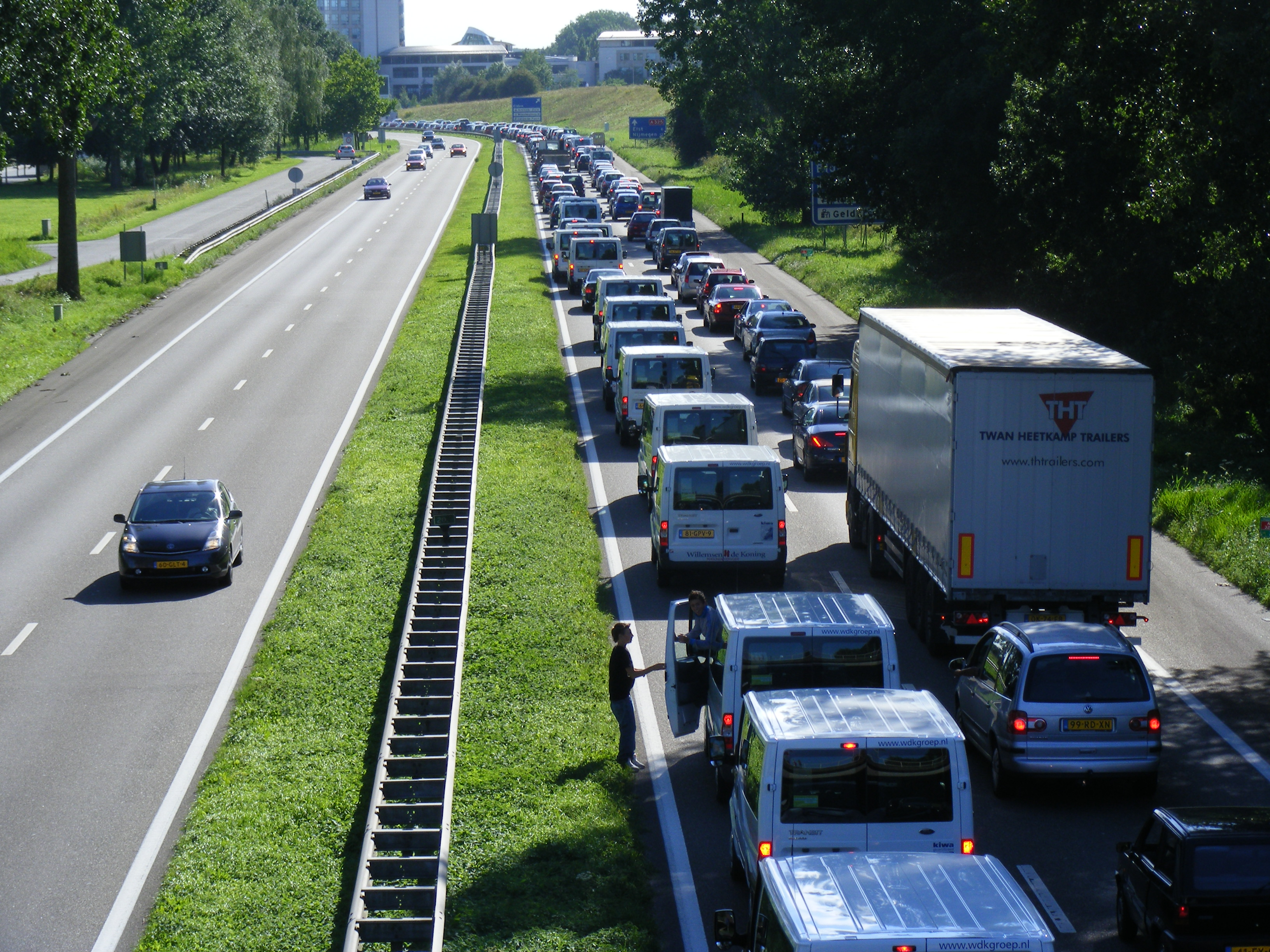
Traffic jam on the A325 (Arnhem)

Traffic congestion is common in the Netherlands. The high population density generates significant traffic volumes on both motorways and regular highways. Most congestion occurs in the Randstad, but congestion is a daily structural problem around almost all larger cities. The Dutch motorway network may be one of the densest in the world, but many motorways are lacking sufficient capacity, and many bottlenecks of 4-lane motorways are present throughout the Netherlands. Traffic volumes are higher than in other European countries, comparable to those of Germany and the United Kingdom.

Since the early 1990s shoulder running has been used extensively on many locations throughout the Netherlands. During peak hours, traffic is allowed to use the shoulder as an additional lane. Special signage and electronic signs show if motorists can use the shoulder or not. It has proven to be a short-term solution, as traffic volumes grew substantially because of a redistribution of traffic over the road network, increase of truck traffic and significant construction of new urban developments, resulting in situations where shoulders not only need to be opened during peak hours, but also during off-peak and even during weekends.

== See also ==
- Transport in the Netherlands
- Roads in the Netherlands
- List of motorways in the Netherlands
- European E-roads in the Netherlands
- Rijksstraatweg – History of the first Dutch highway network
- National N-road route numbers (historic)
- Plug-in electric vehicles in the Netherlands
