= N93 =

N93 may refer to:

- N93 (Long Island bus)
- N93 (Netherlands), a road
- Escadrille N.93, a unit of the French Air Force
- HMS Unbeaten (N93), a submarine of the Royal Navy
- Nokia N93, a mobile phone
