= Colyaer Gannet S100 =

Spanish ultralight flying boat

Gannet S100
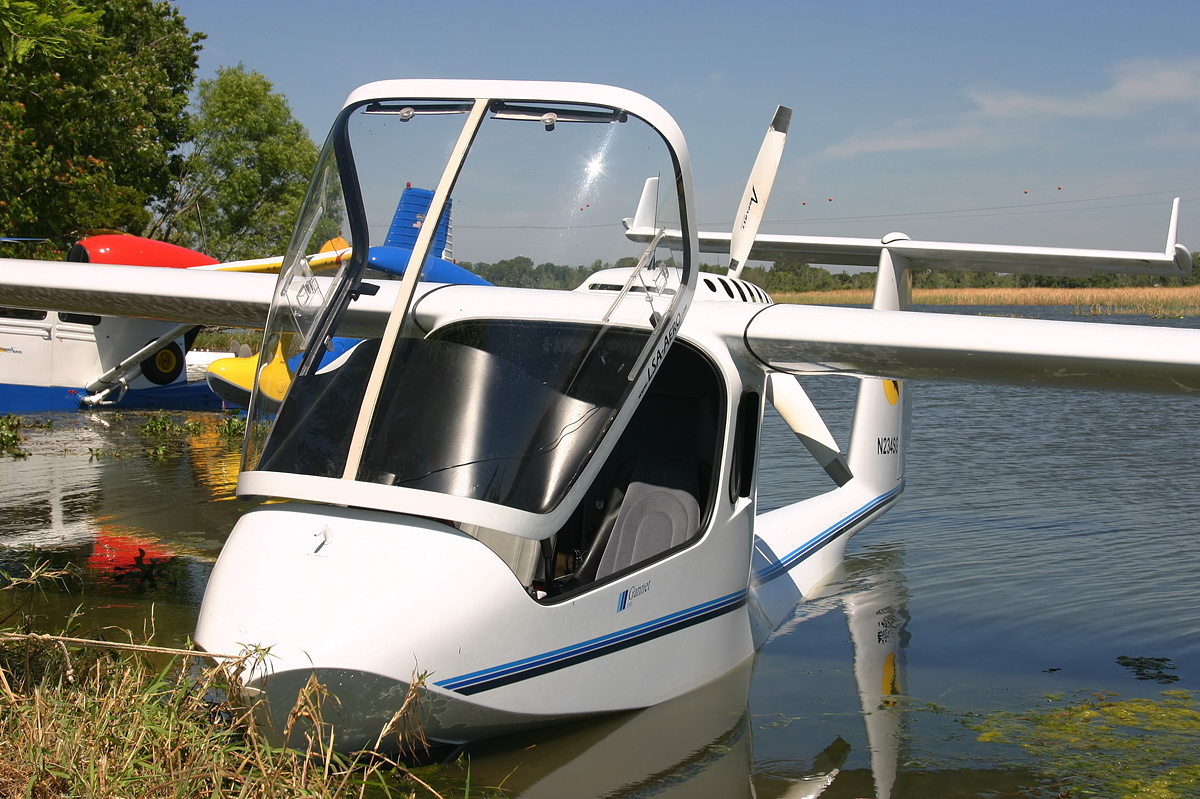

General information
- Type: Ultralight flying boat
- National origin: Spain
- Manufacturer: Colyaer
- Status: In production

History
- Developed from: Colyaer Martin3 S100
- Variant: Colyaer Freedom S100

The Colyaer Gannet S100 is a Spanish ultralight flying boat, designed and produced by Colyaer of Portonovo.

== Design and development ==
The Gannet is an evolution of the Mascato S100 which was designed to comply with the Fédération Aéronautique Internationale microlight rules. It features a cantilever high-wing, a two-seats-in-side-by-side configuration enclosed cockpit, under a forward-hinged bubble canopy, wing-tip pontoons and a single engine in pusher configuration. As a true flying boat, it has no wheeled landing gear.

The Gannet is made entirely from carbon fibre, Kevlar and fibreglass composites. Its 12.4 m (40.7 ft) span wing has an area of 12.0 m^{2} (129 sq ft) and flaps that can be deployed for landing and reflexed for cruise flight. The long wingspan gives the aircraft a good glide ratio and allows power-off soaring flights. The standard engine is the 100 hp (75 kW) Rotax 912ULS four-stroke powerplant and the aircraft can accept engines of 60 to 100 hp (45 to 75 kW).

An amphibious development became the Freedom S100.

== Variants ==
Mascato S100
Early version with empty weight of 270 kg (600 lb) and gross weight of 450 kg (990 lb).
Gannet S100
Later version with empty weight of 325 kg (717 lb) and gross weight of 650 kg (1,430 lb), along with vertical stabilizers added to the tailplane.

== Specifications (Mascato S100) ==
Data from Bertrand

General characteristics

- Crew: one
- Capacity: one passenger
- Wingspan: 12.4 m (40 ft 8 in)
- Wing area: 12.0 m^{2} (129 sq ft)
- Empty weight: 240 kg (529 lb)
- Gross weight: 450 kg (992 lb)
- Fuel capacity: 140 litres (31 imp gal; 37 US gal)
- Powerplant: 1 × Rotax 912ULS four cylinder, liquid and air-cooled, four stroke aircraft engine, 75 kW (101 hp)

Performance

- Maximum speed: 260 km/h (160 mph, 140 kn)
- Cruise speed: 180 km/h (110 mph, 97 kn)
- Stall speed: 65 km/h (40 mph, 35 kn)
- Rate of climb: 5 m/s (980 ft/min)
- Wing loading: 37.5 kg/m^{2} (7.7 lb/sq ft)
