= Mascato =

Mascato can refer to:

- Colyaer Mascato S100, a Spanish flying boat
- David Mascató, a Spanish sprint canoer
