= Colyaer =

Spanish aircraft manufacturer

Colyaer SL
- Type: Private company
- Industry: Aerospace
- Founded: 1995
- Headquarters: Portonovo, Spain
- Products: Ultralight aircraft
- Website: www.colyaer.com

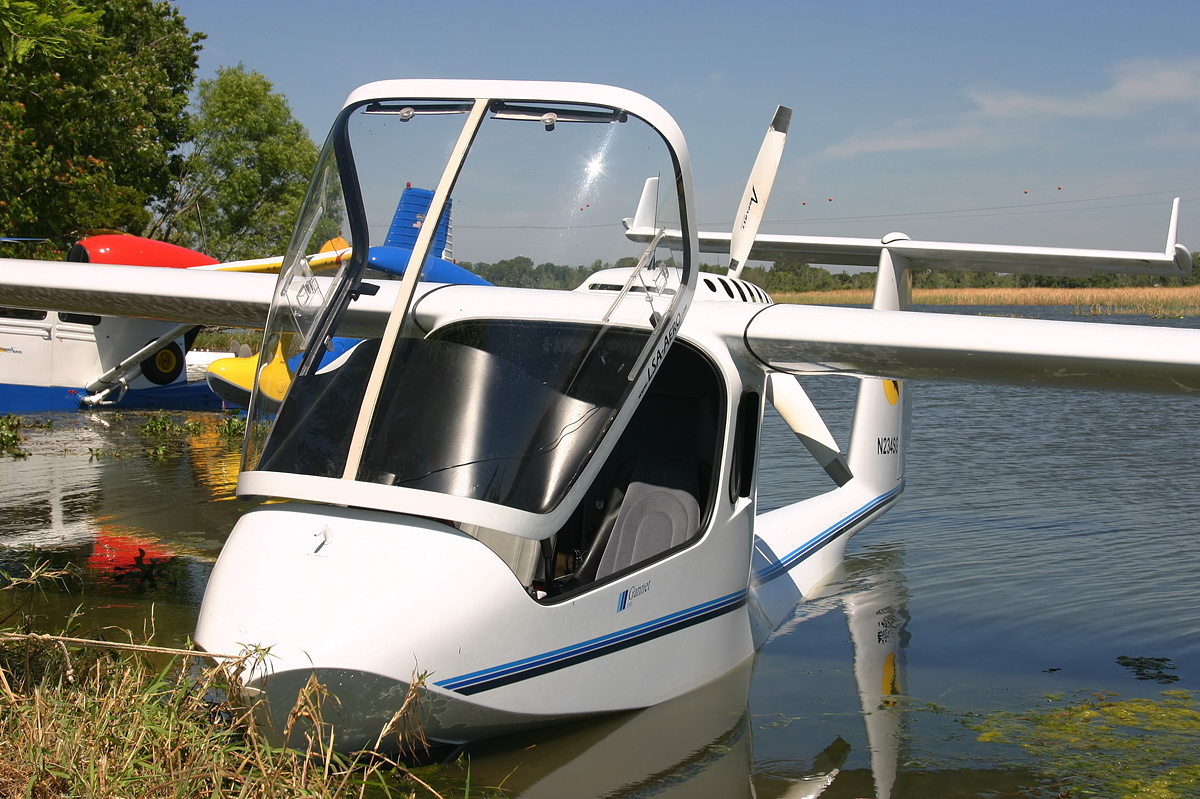
Colyaer Gannet S100

Colyaer SL is a Spanish aircraft manufacturer based in Portonovo that was founded in 1995. The company specializes in the design and manufacture of kit aircraft.

In 2015 the Colyaer Freedom S100 and the Colyaer Martin3 S100 were marketed by Galicia Avionica SL.

== Aircraft ==
Summary of aircraft built by Colyaer
Model name	First flight	Number built	Type
Colyaer Freedom S100	2006		amphibious flying boat
Colyaer Gannet S100			flying boat
Colyaer Martin3 S100			ultralight aircraft
Colyaer Mascato S100			amphibious flying boat
