= Caneliñas =

Beach in Spain

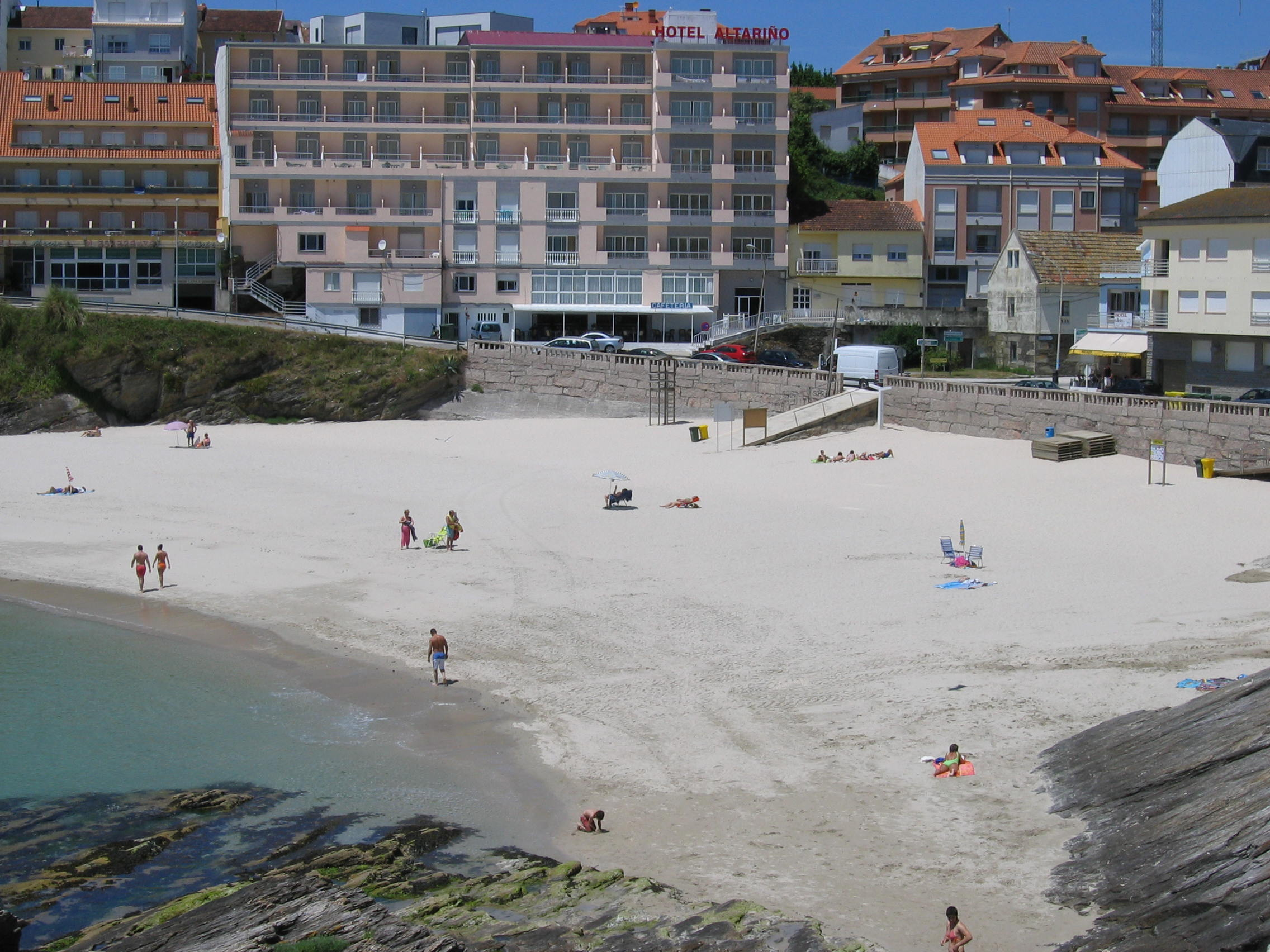

The beach Caneliñas is an area located within the center of 'Portonovo' , in the parish of Adina, Sanxenxo, Spain. It is one of the urban beaches of the village of Sanxenxo together with Baltar. It is crossed by the avenue of Pontevedra. It is a small beach about 150 meters, with crystal clear water and fine white sand located next to Canelas and Baltar west. In summer there are activities such as Zumba, football, and yoga.
