= N93 road (Netherlands) =

National Road 93 (Dutch: Nationale weg 93) or simply N93, was a highway route in the Netherlands from 1957 through 1985. It formed part of the Dutch National highway network and connected Tilburg (E312) with Emmeloord (N91). A stretch of road between Tilburg and the Belgian border was also part of the initial route.

In 1957, road numbering was introduced in the Netherlands and the Rijkswegenplan foresaw in an increasing number of highways, together forming a nationwide system. Along with the pan-European E-road network, which designated routes of international importance, a series of N-roads was devised to designate those routes not included in the European system, but considered of national importance.
In 1985 the second generation of E-road numbering was implemented, leading to an update of the National Road network as well. With the N91 now heading south to Almere and Utrecht, the N93 was extended northwards. The section leading to the border with Belgium was abandoned and subsequently downgraded.

While the N-road numbers were originally signposted everywhere, they were gradually replaced on road signs by the formerly administrative Rijksweg and provincial numberings, starting in 1976 and 1978 respectively. Ultimately the old N93 was broken up into five sections that now carry different numbers.

== Route overview ==
Highway N93 First section (Emmeloord-Nijmegen):

Province	F.A.H.	Junction	Intersecting roads	Historical Municipality	Notes
Flevoland	N38	Emmeloord	N91	Noordoostpolder	
Flevoland	N38		Highway 352	Noordoostpolder	
Overijssel	N38	level crossing	Road 765	Kampen	
Overijssel	N38		Highway 307	Kampen	
Overijssel	N38		Road 763	Kamperveen	
Gelderland	N50	Hattemerbroek	E232	Hattem	begin of motorway regulations
Gelderland	N50	Hattem		Hattem	
Gelderland	N50	Heerde		Heerde	
Gelderland	N50	Epe (North)		Heerde	
Gelderland	N50	Epe	Highway 309	Epe	
Gelderland	N50	Vaassen	Road 792	Vaassen	
Gelderland	N50	Apeldoorn (North)	Highway 304	Apeldoorn	
Gelderland	N50	Apeldoorn	Highway 345	Apeldoorn	
Gelderland	N50	Beekbergen	E30	Beekbergen	
Gelderland	N50	Beekbergen	Road 786	Beekbergen	
Gelderland	N50	Hoenderloo	Road 788	Loenen	
Gelderland	N50	Schaarsbergen	Highway 311	Arnhem	
Gelderland	N50	Arnhem (North)	Road 784	Arnhem	
Gelderland	N50	Waterberg	E35	Arnhem	section shared with E 35 for 5 kilometres
Gelderland	N52	Velperbroek Roundabout	N5	Arnhem	end of motorway regulations
Gelderland	N52	level crossing (2x)	Road 810	Arnhem	crossing river Lower Rhine
Gelderland	N52			Huissen	
Gelderland	N6	South Arnhem square	Highway 325	Elden	
Gelderland	N6	Elden		Elden	begin of motorway regulations
Gelderland	N6	Elst		Elst	
Gelderland	N6	Ressen	N96	Bemmel	section between Velperbroek and Ressen shared with N 96 until completion of the latter connection to Zevenaar
Gelderland	N6	level crossing (2x)		Lent	end of motorway regulations
Gelderland	N6	Lent		Lent	crossing river Waal

Highway N93 Second section (Nijmegen - Tilburg):

Province	F.A.H.	Junction	Intersecting roads	Historical Municipality	Notes
Gelderland	N6 Sint Canisiussingel /Oranjesingel /Graafsebaan	Emperor Trajan Square	N53	Nijmegen	Within Nijmegen the N 93 follows city roads, with several on-level crossings and traffic lights. A new bridge over the river Waal is under construction, more to the west, relieving the inner city of N 93 traffic congestion.
Gelderland	N6 Sint Canisiussingel /Oranjesingel /Graafsebaan	Emperor Charlemagne Roundabout	N95 Sint Annastraat	Nijmegen	Main square of central Nijmegen
Gelderland	N55	Graafseweg Square	N53 Neerbosscheweg	Nijmegen	
Gelderland	N55	Lindenholt Square	E31	Nijmegen	Leaving the city limits
Gelderland	N55	Bijsterhuizen Roundabout	Highway 324	Wijchen	begin of motorway regulations
Gelderland	N55	Beuningen	Road 847	Wijchen	
Gelderland	N55	Bergharen	Road 845	Wijchen	
Gelderland	N55	Bankhoef	N94	Leur en Hernen	Begin of shared section N93-94
North Brabant	N55	Ravenstein	Highway 277	Huisseling en Neerloon	crossing the river Meuse
North Brabant	N55	Paalgraven	N94	Berghem	End of shared section N93-94
North Brabant	N55	Oss (East)	Highways 265 and 324	Heesch	
North Brabant	N55	Oss		Heesch	
North Brabant	N55	Nuland		Nuland	Last section to be upgraded to motorway conditions, in 2004.
North Brabant	N55	Kruisstraat	Road 625	Rosmalen	
North Brabant	N55	Rosmalen (East)		Rosmalen	
North Brabant	N55	Rosmalen		Rosmalen	
North Brabant	N7 Bois-le-Duc beltway	Hintham	E25	Rosmalen	section shared with E 25 for 6 kilometres, including two exits (Den Dolder /Sint-Michielsgestel)
North Brabant	N65	Vught	N65	Vught	end of E 25 shared section
North Brabant	N65	level crossing (2x)	Helvoirtseweg	Vught	end of motorway regulations
North Brabant	N65	level crossing	Torenstraat	Helvoirt	
North Brabant	N65	level crossing	Mgr. Zwijsenstraat	Haaren	
North Brabant	N65	level crossing (2x)		Oisterwijk and Udenhout	
North Brabant	N65	Berkel-Enschot		Berkel-Enschot	begin of motorway regulations
North Brabant	N65	Tilburg (North)	Highway 261	Berkel-Enschot	Tilburg ring road
North Brabant	N65	De Baars	E312	Berkel-Enschot	End of the route

The total length of the N 93 is approximately 180 kilometers (190 when the shared sections with E 25 and E 35 are included). The majority of the route consisted of motorway, with the main interruption being the section through Nijmegen which caused significant delays. A new bridge is under construction west of the city, aimed at creating a new urban beltway. No official decision has been made public about its new road number so far.
