= Roads in the Netherlands =

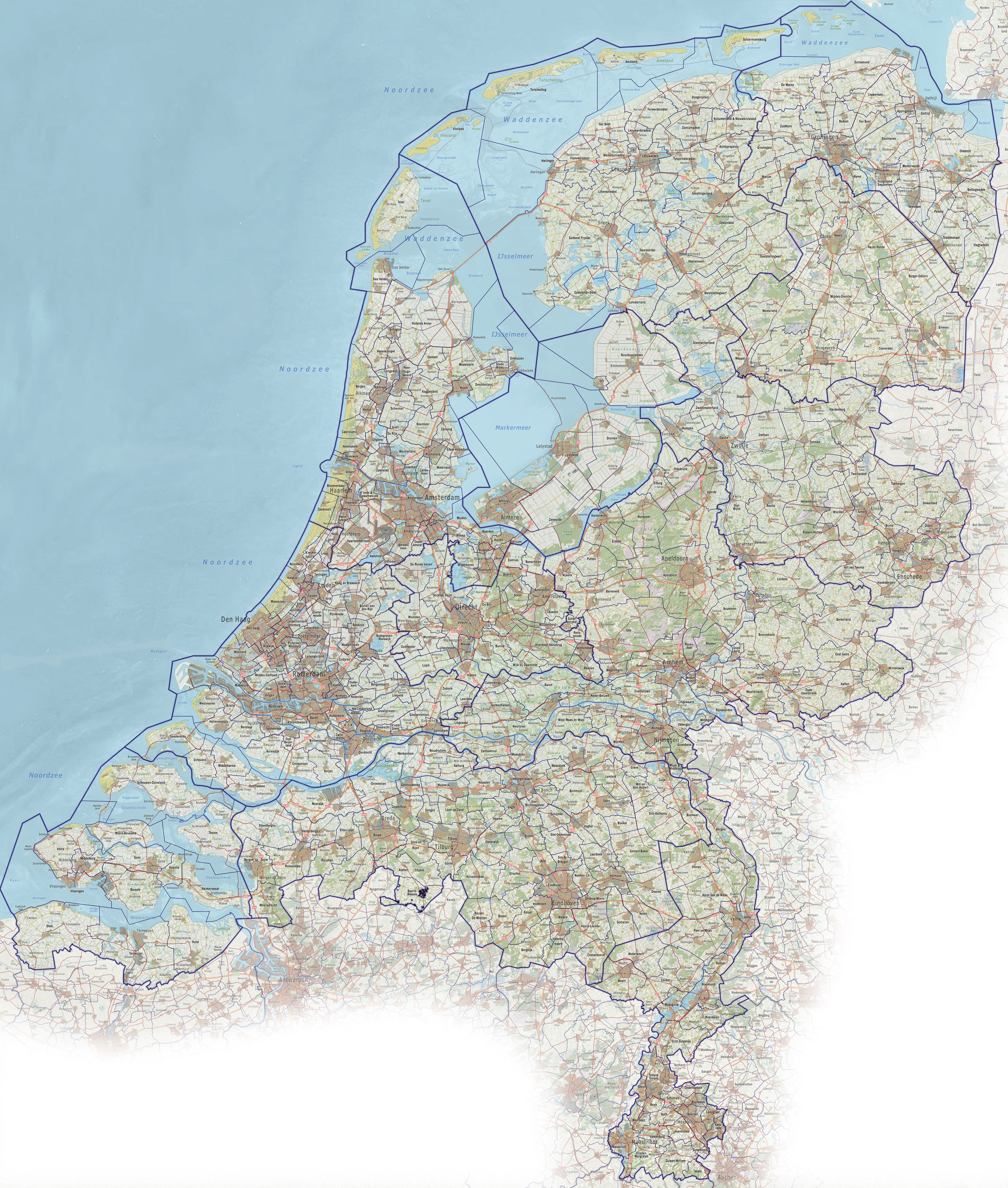
Detailed road map of the Netherlands (2012)

The Netherlands has a public road network totaling 139,000 km, one of the densest in the world. (Note: Japan has the same per country road density, but the Netherlands' area includes 18.4% inland water, compared to just 0.8% for Japan.) Its use has increased since the 1950s and now exceeds 200 billion km traveled per year, three quarters of which is by car, making it among the most intensely used road networks. In 2019, the World Economic Forum ranked the quality of Dutch road infrastructure as the best in Europe and second to Singapore out of 141 countries.

Dutch roads include at least 3,530 km of motorways (controlled-access highways) and expressways (limited-access roads), and with a motorway density of 64 kilometres per 1,000 km^{2}, the country also has one of the densest motorway networks in the world. The Netherlands' main highway network (hoofdwegennet) consists of 5,200 km of national roads, together with the most prominent provincial roads. Although only about 2,500 km of roads are fully constructed to motorway standards, most of the remainder are also expressways for fast motor vehicles only.

Since 1997, a national traffic safety program called "Duurzaam Veilig (Verkeer)", or "Sustainable (Road) Safety" has had a major influence on the road network. Traffic calming was applied on a massive scale; by 2009, more than 33,000 km of rural roads had their speed limit reduced from 80 km/h (50 mph) to 60 km/h (37 mph), and over 41,000 km of urban roads were limited from 50 km/h (31 mph) to 30 km/h (19 mph), amounting to over half the national road network being calmed. A popular calming and collision reduction measure has been to replace intersections with roundabouts in order to reduce serious T-bone collisions. By 2015, there were almost 5,000 roundabouts throughout the Netherlands. (Note: In 2012 a Dutch TV-show calculated that the centre dots alone of the country's roundabouts had a cumulative area greater than Vatican City.)

Except for motorways and expressways, most Dutch roads support cyclists; 35,000 km, a quarter of all roads, feature dedicated cycle tracks that are physically segregated from motor traffic. Another 4,700 km of roads have clearly marked bike lanes, and on other roads traffic calming has allowed cyclists and motorists to safely mix. Busy junctions sometimes give priority to cyclists, and in streets such as fietsstraten (cycle streets) and woonerven (home zones), bicycles always have priority over cars.

== History ==
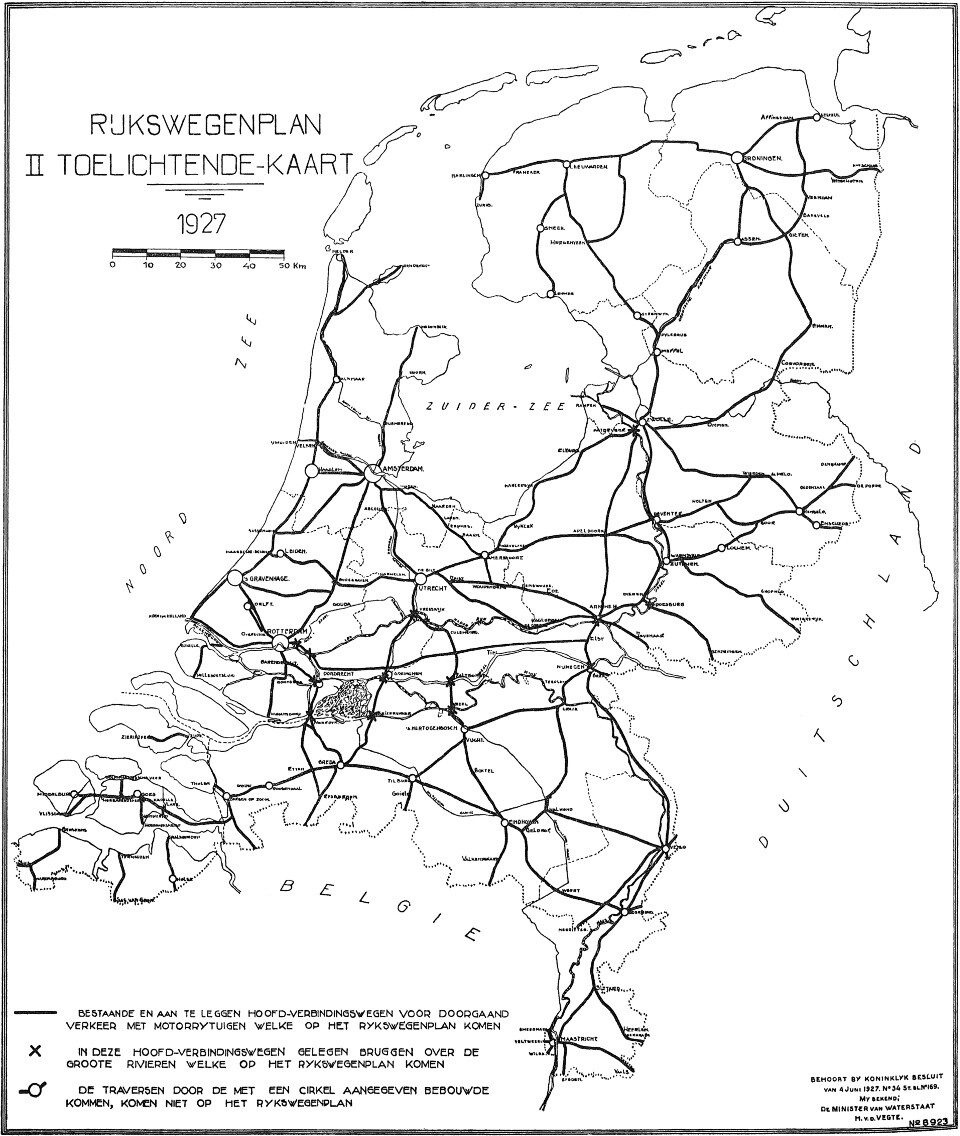
The 1927 Rijkswegenplan was the first new Dutch national highway structure plan in a century.

The first motorway in the Netherlands dates back to 1936, when the current A12 was opened to traffic between Voorburg and Zoetermeer, near The Hague. Motorway construction accelerated in the 1960s and 1970s but slowed in the 1980s. Current motorway expansion mostly occurs outside the Randstad.

General maximum speed limits were introduced in 1957 (50 km/h within built-up areas) and in 1973 (100 km/h on extra-urban highways); the motorway limit was raised to 120 km/h in 1988.

== Roads by management authority ==
=== National and provincial roads ===
About 5,200 km of national roads (rijkswegen) are controlled by the Rijkswaterstaat, and the country's twelve provinces control about 7,800 km of provincial roads. Most motorways are national roads, and the remaining national roads are mostly expressways. Only a few motorways are provincial, and these are generally shorter and serve regional traffic.

=== Municipal roads ===
Municipal roads make up the bulk of the Dutch road network, totalling 120,000 km.

=== Water council roads ===
Aside from the division into provinces, the Netherlands is also divided into 21 water management districts. Together with other authorities, they own and control another 7,500 km of roads.

== Roads by legal types and definitions ==
From 1998 to 2007, more than 33,000 km of roads have been converted to regional access roads with a speed limit of 60 km/h, as indicated by signage. Regional access roads are visually distinct from other roads by having no center line marking. Slower vehicles and non-motorised traffic are allowed; busier roads have adjacent cycle tracks, while quieter ones have advisory bike lanes. Regional access roads can fall under any of the road management authorities.

On extra-urban roundabouts, the CROW recommends that motor vehicles have priority over cycle tracks, as opposed to urban roundabouts where cycle tracks have priority.

=== Within built-up areas ===
From 1998 through 2007, more than 41,000 km of city streets have been converted to local access roads with a speed limit of 30 km/h, for the purpose of traffic calming.

Woonerf

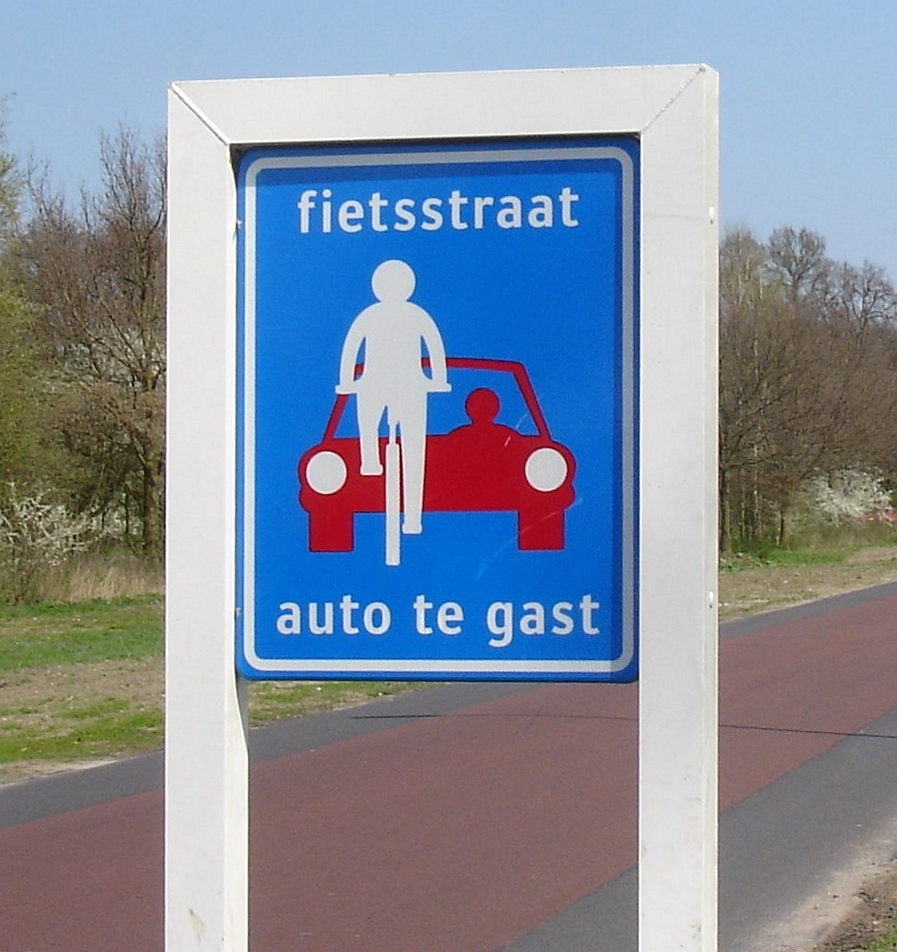
cyclestreet (fietsstraat) sign (unofficial)

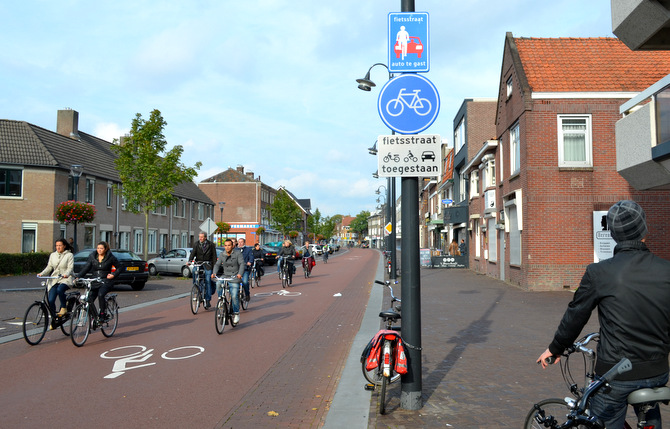
A fietsstraat (bike street) where bicycles are the main form of transport and cars are considered "guests".

Depending on how individual municipalities interpreted the 1997 Sustainable Safety policy guidelines, woonerven have come under pressure from a drive to implement continuous zones of 30 km/h (19 mph) on local access streets. In some towns, this has led to residents protesting against the doubling of local speed limits from 15 km/h to 30 km/h. Woonerven are still widespread and new ones are still built, sometimes because of space restrictions. In 2011, 20% of all Dutch homes were still located in woonerf areas, and around 2 million people (over 10% of the country) were living in woonerven.

== Notable roads and statistics ==
As a side effect of the dense road network, roadside and verge grass strips account for three percent of the Netherlands' total land area.

=== Quality ===
In 2019, a World Economic Forum report ranked the quality (extensiveness and condition) of the Dutch road infrastructure as the best in Europe, with a 6.4 score on a 7‑point scale. It was ranked the second-best of 141 countries in the world behind Singapore and ahead of Switzerland. Although traffic congestion is a relative constant in the Netherlands, a Europe-focused summary of TomTom's 2021 traffic congestion statistics found that there were no Dutch cities in the global Top‑100. There were also no Dutch cities in the high congestion category, although Haarlem was ranked #103 at 28% congestion in 2021, 2% below the "heavy" category.

=== Major motorways ===
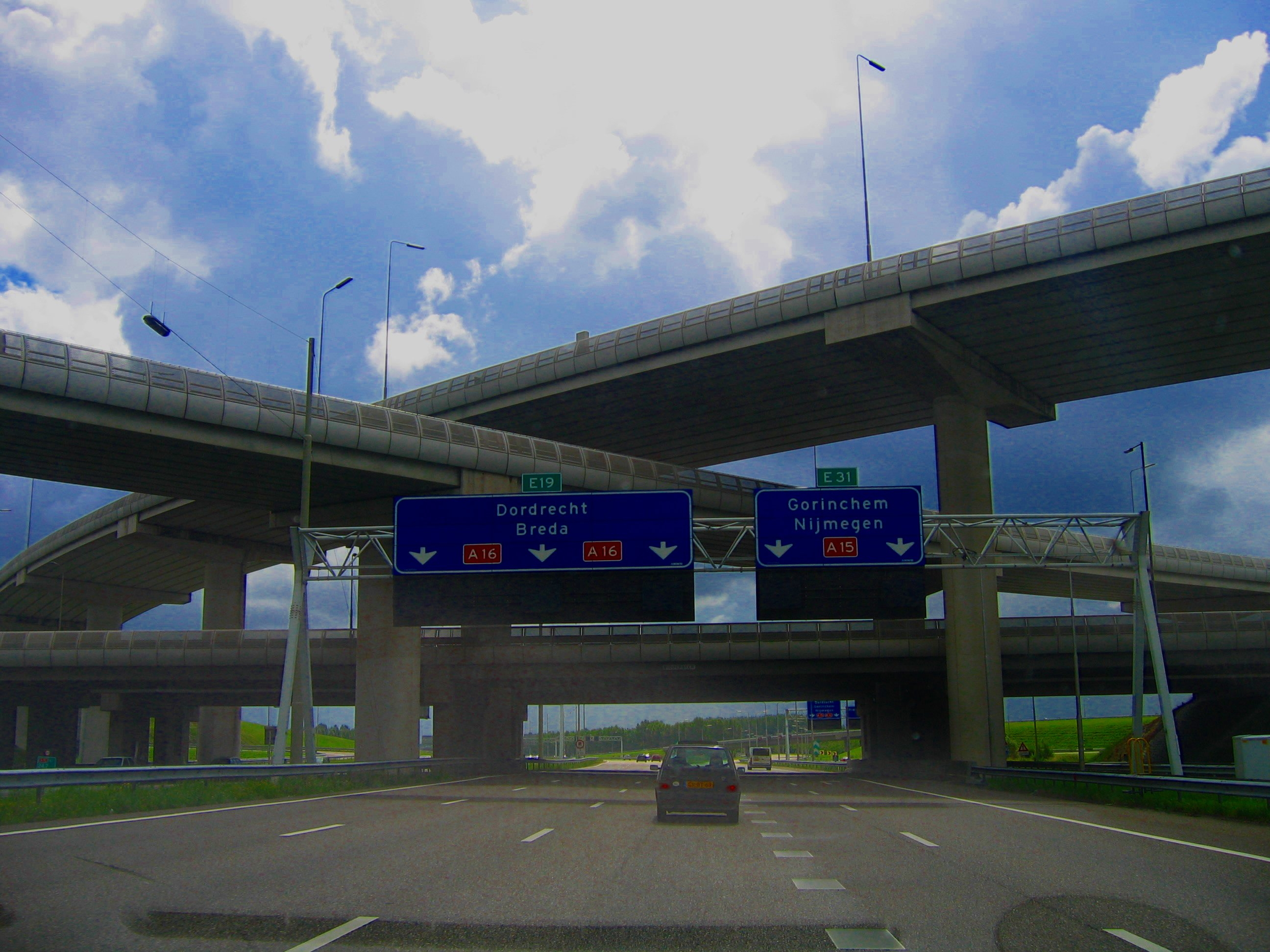
Motorway A15 / A16 near Rotterdam

The busiest Dutch motorway is the A13 between the Hague and Rotterdam, with a traffic volume of 140,000 motor vehicles per day. Utrecht, in the centre of the country, has the busiest motorways on average (almost 100,000 vehicles a day), with major motorways A1, A2, A12, A27 and A28 running through it.

The number of passing motorised vehicles is counted every minute of the day at 20,000 measuring stations on the Dutch motorway network.

== See also ==
- Transport in the Netherlands
- Road transport in the Netherlands
- List of motorways in the Netherlands
- European E-roads in the Netherlands
- Rijksstraatweg
- National N-road route numbers (historic)
- Woonerf
- Fietsstraat
- Cycling in the Netherlands
