= Rijksstraatweg =

Road type in the Netherlands

Rijksstraatweg or simply Straatweg (Steenweg in Belgium) was the term for paved roads of interregional significance in the Netherlands in the 19th and early 20th centuries. These roads were built by the national government, and formed the country's first centrally planned highway network. They received route numbers, eventually resulting in a nationwide network of 82 highways. It formed the basis for today's system of nationally controlled roads (called Rijkswegen), the Netherlands' main highway grid.

The network was both inspired by, and an expansion of the network of imperial highways constructed by France during the era of Emperor Napoléon Bonaparte. In 1795 a new Dutch republic had been proclaimed with the armed support of the revolutionary French Republic. The country's rule was centralised, and French influence started getting ever stronger. In 1804 Napoleon became emperor of France, and between 1810 and 1813 the Netherlands was made a full part of the French Empire. During those years, construction of the French imperial highways was also extended to Holland. Amsterdam was connected to Paris by Route Impériale no. 2. The section between Amsterdam and Utrecht is today still a part of the A2 motorway. The name Rijksstraatweg literally translates as "Imperial paved road", reflecting not only the French example, but also the Netherlands' own status, still being a colonial empire at that time.

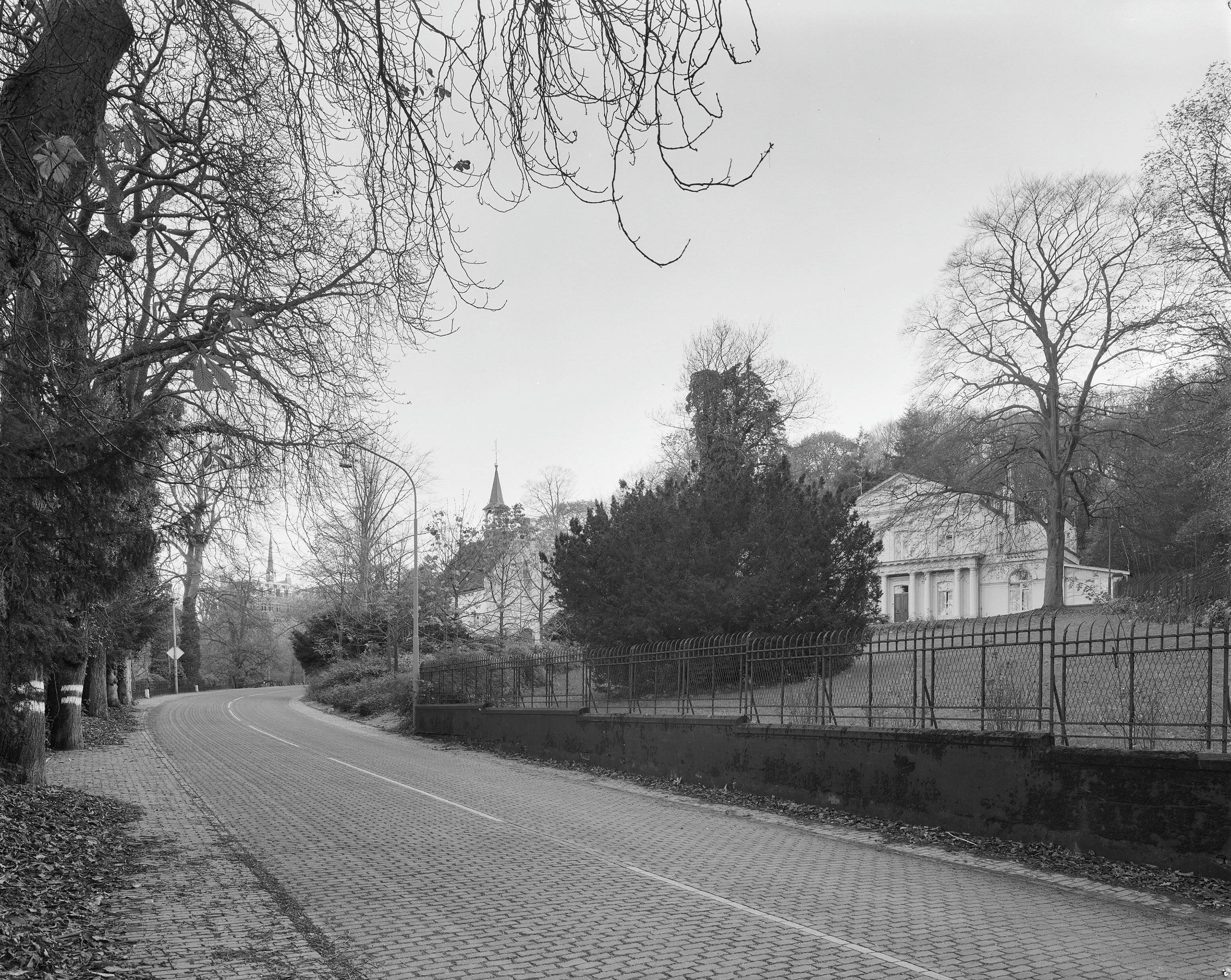
Rijksstraatweg in Ubbergen in 1977. What used to be the N53. Still brick paving at that time.

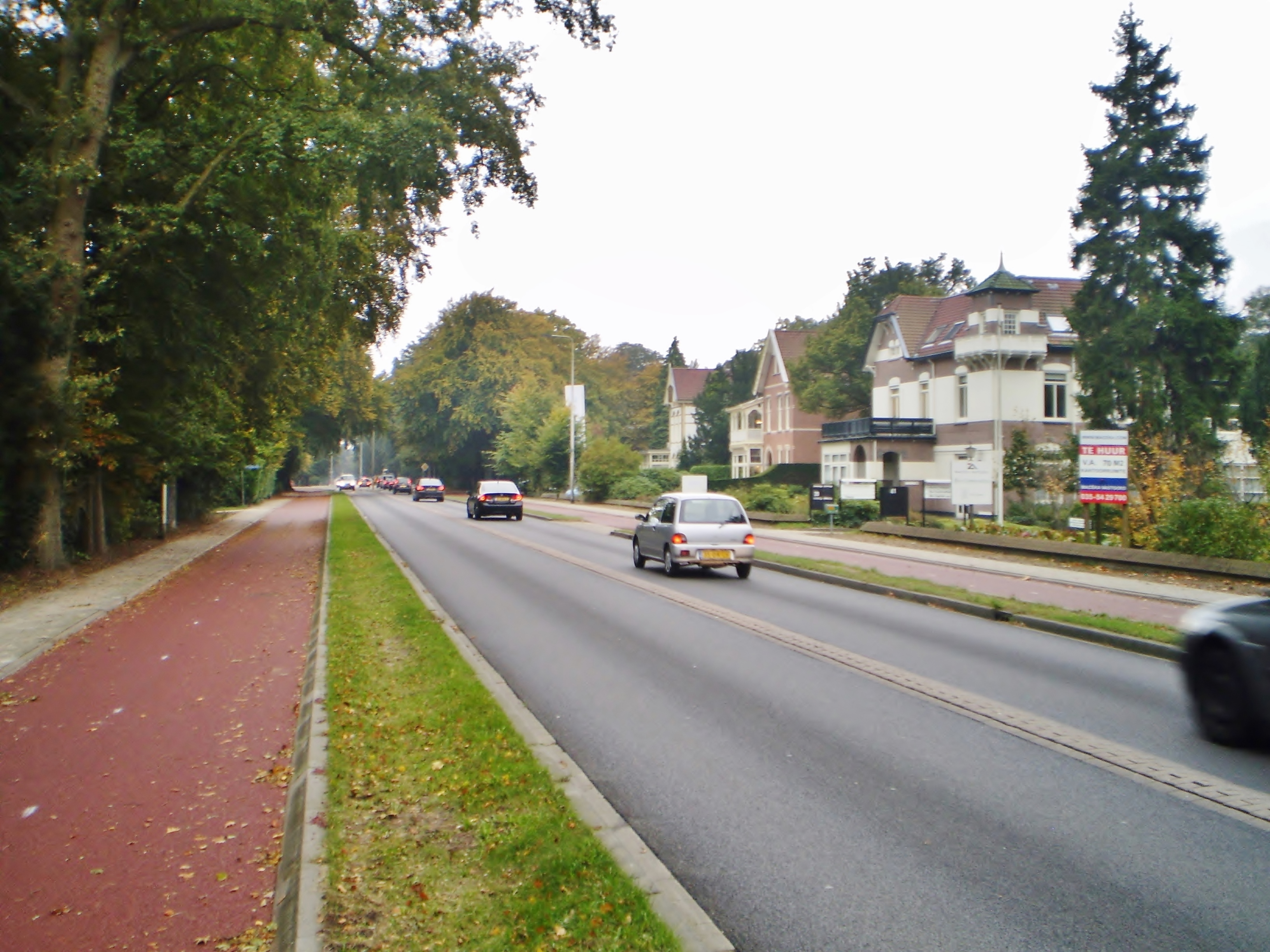
Amsterdamsestraatweg through Baarn (2013). Stately 19th century manors and a 21st-century cycle path.

After the independence of the Kingdom of the Netherlands in 1815, paving of existing and construction of new interregional roads continued. The first plan for 26 national roads, had already been drawn up in 1814. By 1816 it had grown to 31, and to 42 in 1821. In this period, roads between towns were still mostly unpaved, and horse-drawn boats were still common, so this was a significant development. But costs had to be weighed. Paving was done predominantly in regions with a sufficient amount of industry, and tolls were charged. Important routes across the borders were also paved.
The numbering was based on geographical location, with its center in Amsterdam, where the highways 1-9 radiated into the country (see list below). Highway 10 connected Leiden with Haarlem, the numbers 11-14 were connected to The Hague, 15-21 to Rotterdam, 22-27 to Utrecht and so forth, up to number 82.

During the rise of steam train railways in the second half of the 19th century, the road network received much less attention, as national funding went largely into developing a solid rail infrastructure. However, when the automobile made its way to the general public, it became inevitable to improve the highway network for motorised traffic. In 1927 the first Rijkswegenplan was produced, the first Dutch national highway structure plan for a century; paving the way for the modern highway system that is still in place today. From that time on, the name Rijksweg was used in favour of the previous Rijksstraatweg. Eventually the original system was almost completely absorbed into the Rijksweg network. The first Rijkswegenplan based its route numbers on the existing system, but these have been revised many times since.
So far the rijks(straat)weg numbers had been mostly administrative, and not displayed on signposts. At best they were indicated on kilometre poles and can still be found on old maps. In Leiden, an old pole is still situated along Straatweg 4 (Haagweg), signaling 16 km from The Hague. Signposting highway route numbers on road signs started in 1957, when the European E-road numbers and the complementing National N-road numbers were introduced in the Netherlands. But in 1976 it was decided to signpost the Rijksweg numbers instead, abolishing the N-road numbers, and also displaying them on roads with an E-number, in order to consistently cover the whole network.

The name 'Rijksstraatweg' or the suffix '-straatweg' is still often found on local street names, e.g. the Amsterdamsestraatweg in Utrecht (part of Route 2).

== Rijksstraatwegen ==
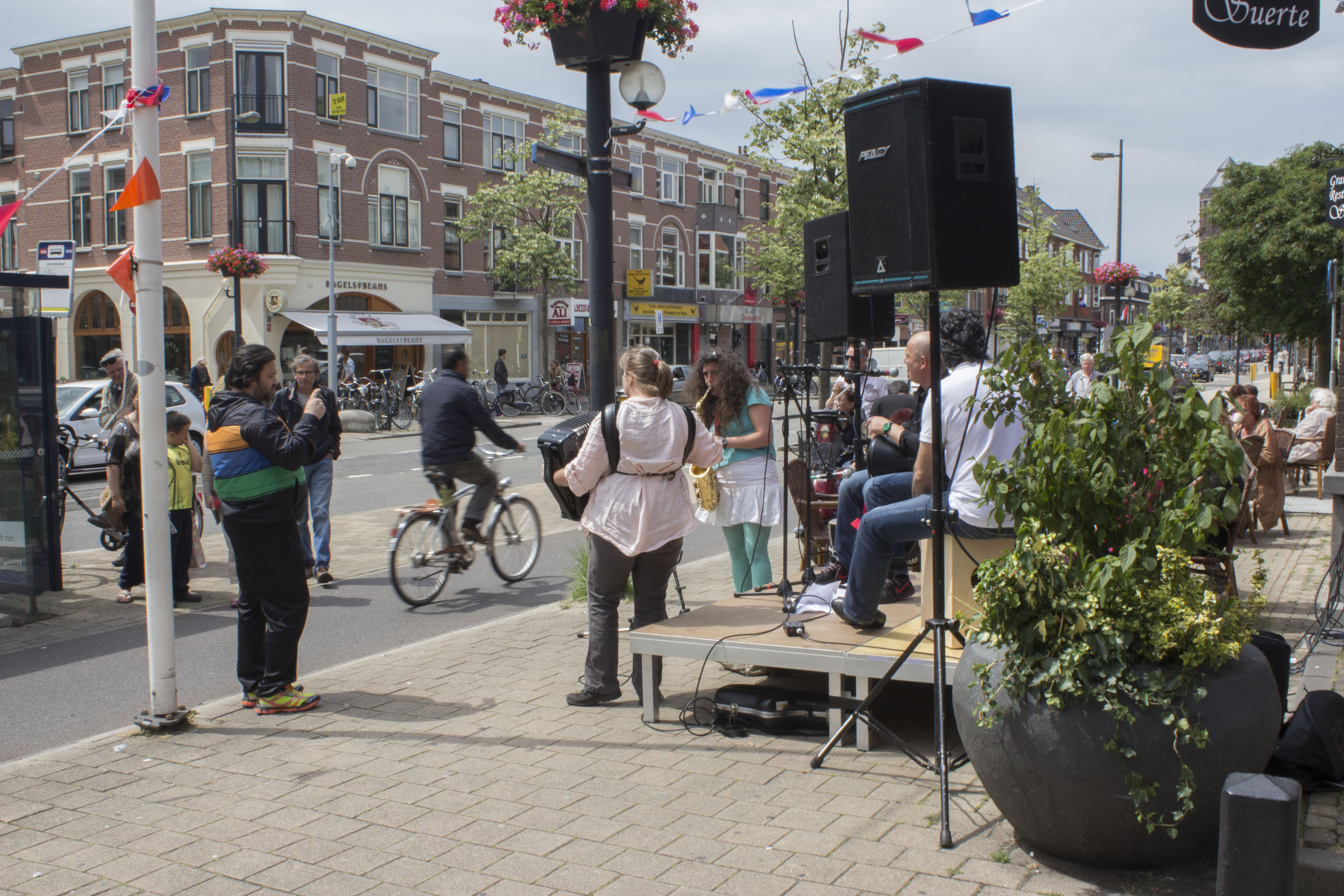
The Amsterdamsestraatweg in Utrecht is now the Netherlands’ longest shopping street. The 5km long dead straight street is a remainder of what was the main highway from Amsterdam to Utrecht from early 19th to early 20th century.

=== Radiating from Amsterdam ===
N0 Beltway around central Amsterdam

N1 Dam Square - Diemen - Muiden - Naarden - Bussum - Hilversum - Baarn - Amersfoort

N2 Dam Square - Duivendrecht - Abcoude - Loenen - Breukelen - Maarssen - Zuilen - Utrecht

N3 Dam Square - Amstelveen - Ter Aar - Gouda - Nieuwerkerk a/d IJssel - Kralingen - Rotterdam

N4 Dam Square - Sloten - Haarlemmermeer - Leiden - Wassenaar - The Hague

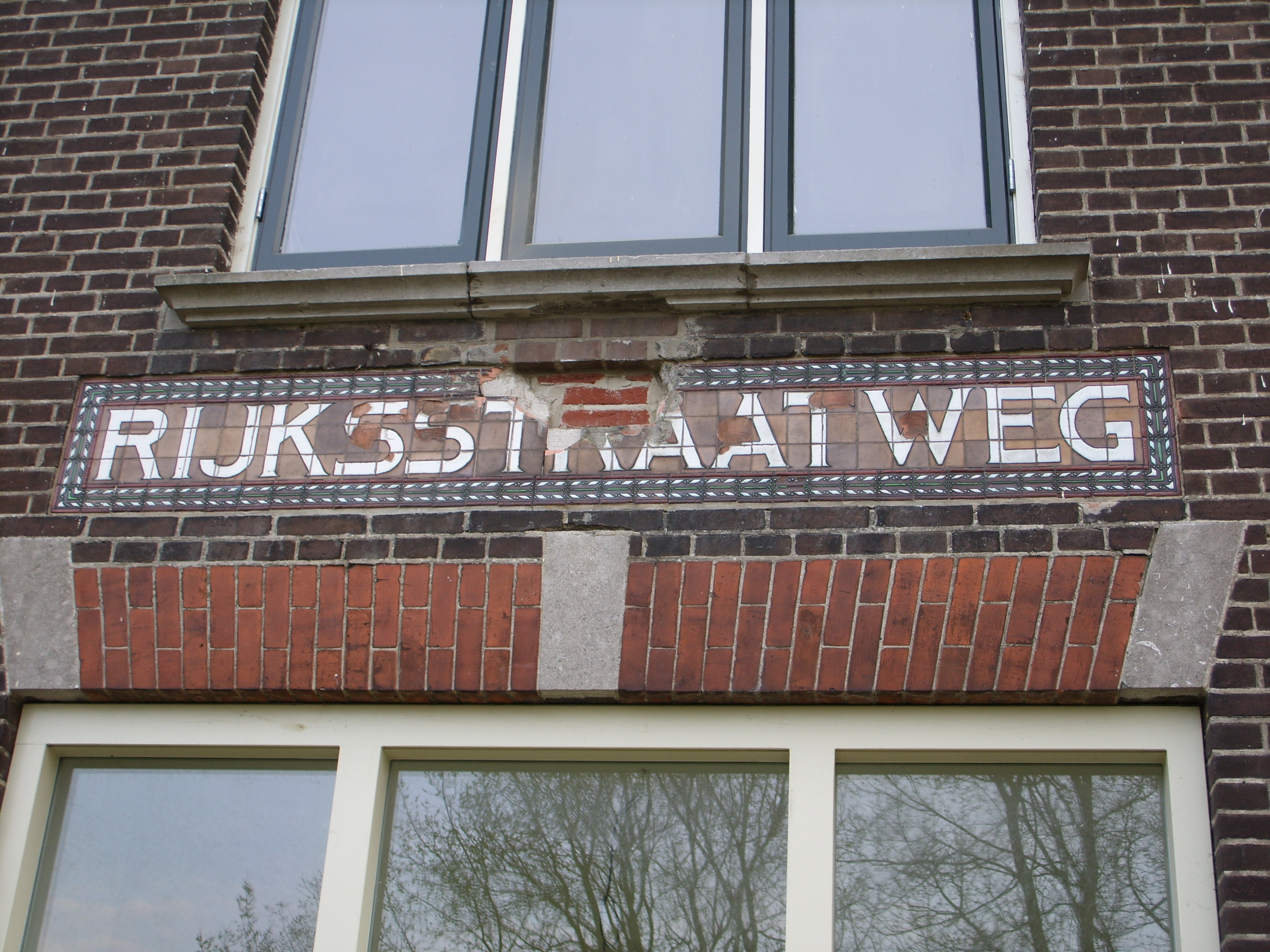
Tiled street name on former train station at Rijksstraatweg in Haarlem

N5 Dam Square - Halfweg - Haarlem - Bloemendaal - Zandvoort

N6 Dam Square - Spaarndam - Velsen - Beverwijk - Castricum - Alkmaar - Den Helder

N7 Dam Square - Zaandam - Wormerveer - Heerhugowaard - Langedijk - Schagen - Wieringen

N8 Dam Square - Nieuwendam - Purmerend - Hoorn - Middenmeer - Wieringen - Wonseradeel

N9 Dam Square - Zeeburg - Almere - Kampen - Zwolle

=== Originating in The Hague, Rotterdam or Utrecht ===
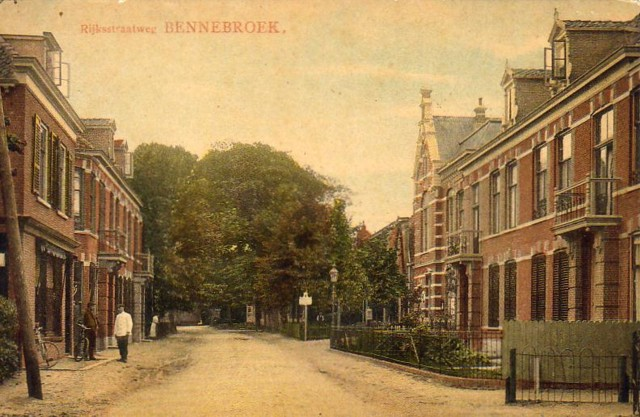
Rijksstraatweg between Leiden and Haarlem running through Bennebroek (ca. 1910)

N10 Leiden - Sassenheim - Lisse - Haarlem - Velsen

N11 The Hague - Voorschoten - Leiden - Alphen - Bodegraven - Woerden - De Meern - Utrecht

N12 Scheveningen - Voorburg - Zoetermeer - Gouda - Oudewater - De Meern - Utrecht

N13 The Hague - Delft - Overschie - Rotterdam

N14 The Hague - Naaldwijk - Hook of Holland

N15 Rotterdam - IJsselmonde - Ridderkerk - Gorinchem - Waardenburg - Geldermalsen - Tiel

N16 Rotterdam - IJsselmonde - Dordrecht - Moerdijk - Breda - Zundert

N17 Rotterdam - Barendrecht - Numansdorp - Willemstad - Steenbergen - Bergen op Zoom

N18 Rotterdam - Charlois - Spijkenisse - Hellevoetsluis - Stellendam - Middelharnis

N19 Hillegersberg - Rotterdam - Charlois - Pernis - Rozenburg - Hellevoetsluis

N20 Rotterdam - Delfshaven - Schiedam - Vlaardingen - Hook of Holland

N21 Rozenburg - Maassluis - Delft - Pijnacker - Zoetermeer

N22 Utrecht - Maartensdijk - Hilversum - Huizen

N23 Utrecht - De Bilt - Soest - Amersfoort

N24 Utrecht - Zeist - Renswoude - Ede - Arnhem - Westervoort - Zevenaar - Elten

N25 Utrecht - Bunnik - Doorn - Rhenen - Wageningen - Arnhem

N26 Utrecht - Houten - Culemborg - Geldermalsen - Zaltbommel - Bois le Duc

N27 Utrecht - Nieuwegein - Vianen - Gorinchem - Sleeuwijk - Oosterhout - Breda

=== Originating elsewhere ===
N28 Amersfoort - Nijkerk - Harderwijk - Wezep - Zwolle

N29 Amersfoort - Voorthuizen - Apeldoorn

N30 Nijkerk - Barneveld - Renswoude - Veenendaal - Rhenen

N31 Leeuwarden - Franeker - Harlingen - Wonseradeel

N32 Leeuwarden - Heerenveen - Steenwijk - Meppel - Zwolle

N33 Assen - Veendam - Delfzijl

N34 Groningen - Zuidlaren - Emmen - Coevorden - Avereest

N35 Zwolle - Kampferbeke - Nijverdal - Almelo

N36 Coevorden - Hardenberg - Almelo

N37 Zwolle - Wijhe - Deventer

N38 Oldebroek - Kampen - Emmeloord - Lemmer - Sneek - Wonseradeel

N39 Groningen - Leek - Drachten - Heerenveen - Sneek

N40 Groningen - Hoogezand - Winschoten - Nieuweschans

N41 Leeuwarden - Buitenpost - Groningen - Appingedam - Delfzijl

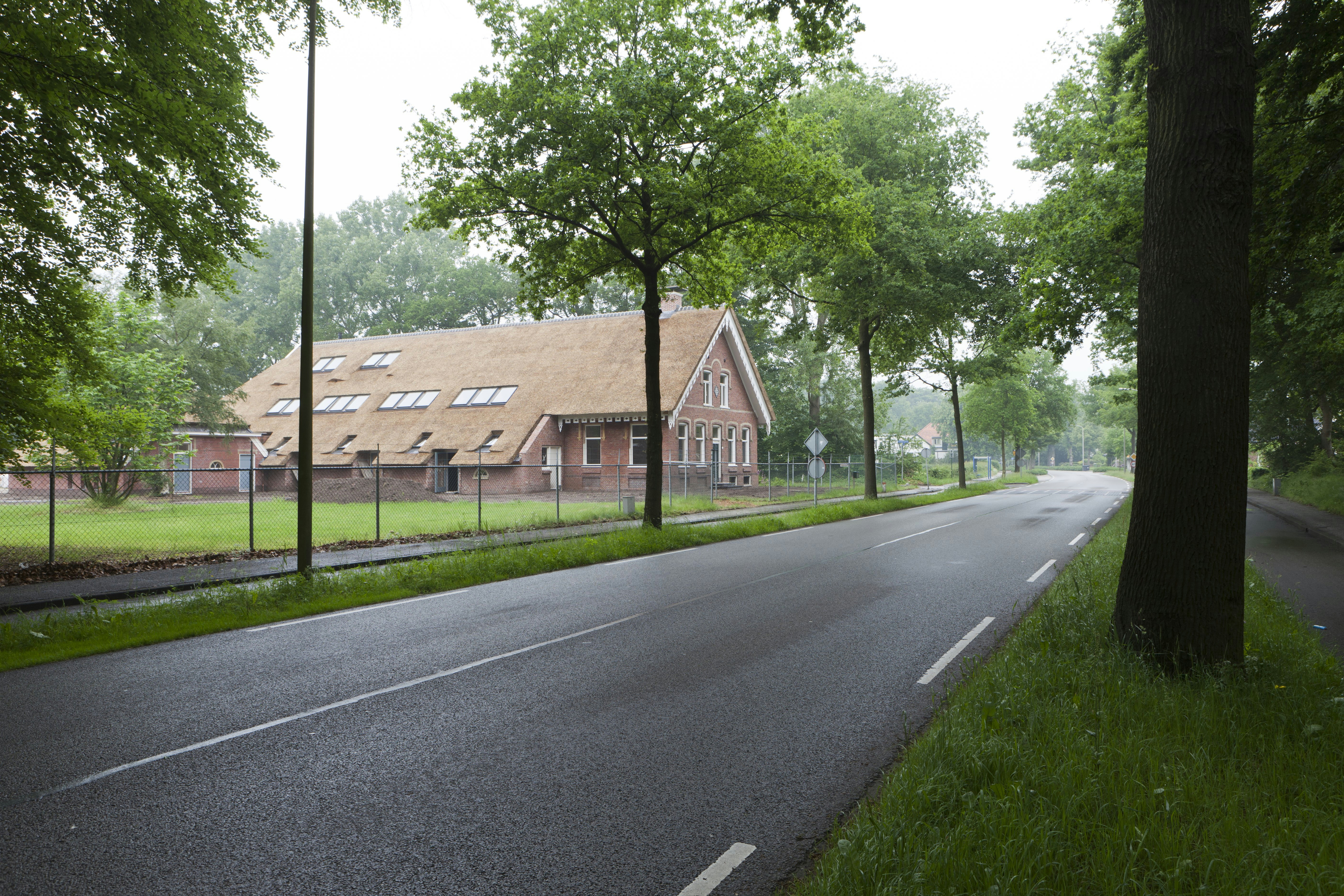
Rijksstraatweg in Glimmen, between Groningen and Assen, now a main municipal road

N42 Groningen - Assen - Smilde - Meppel

N43 Almelo - Borne - Hengelo - Enschede

N44 Apeldoorn - Deventer - Goor - Hengelo - Oldenzaal

N45 Raalte - Deventer - Gorssel - Zutphen

N46 Assen - Hoogeveen - Coevorden

N47 Zutphen - Ruurlo - Groenlo - Winterswijk

N48 Twello - Rheden - Arnhem

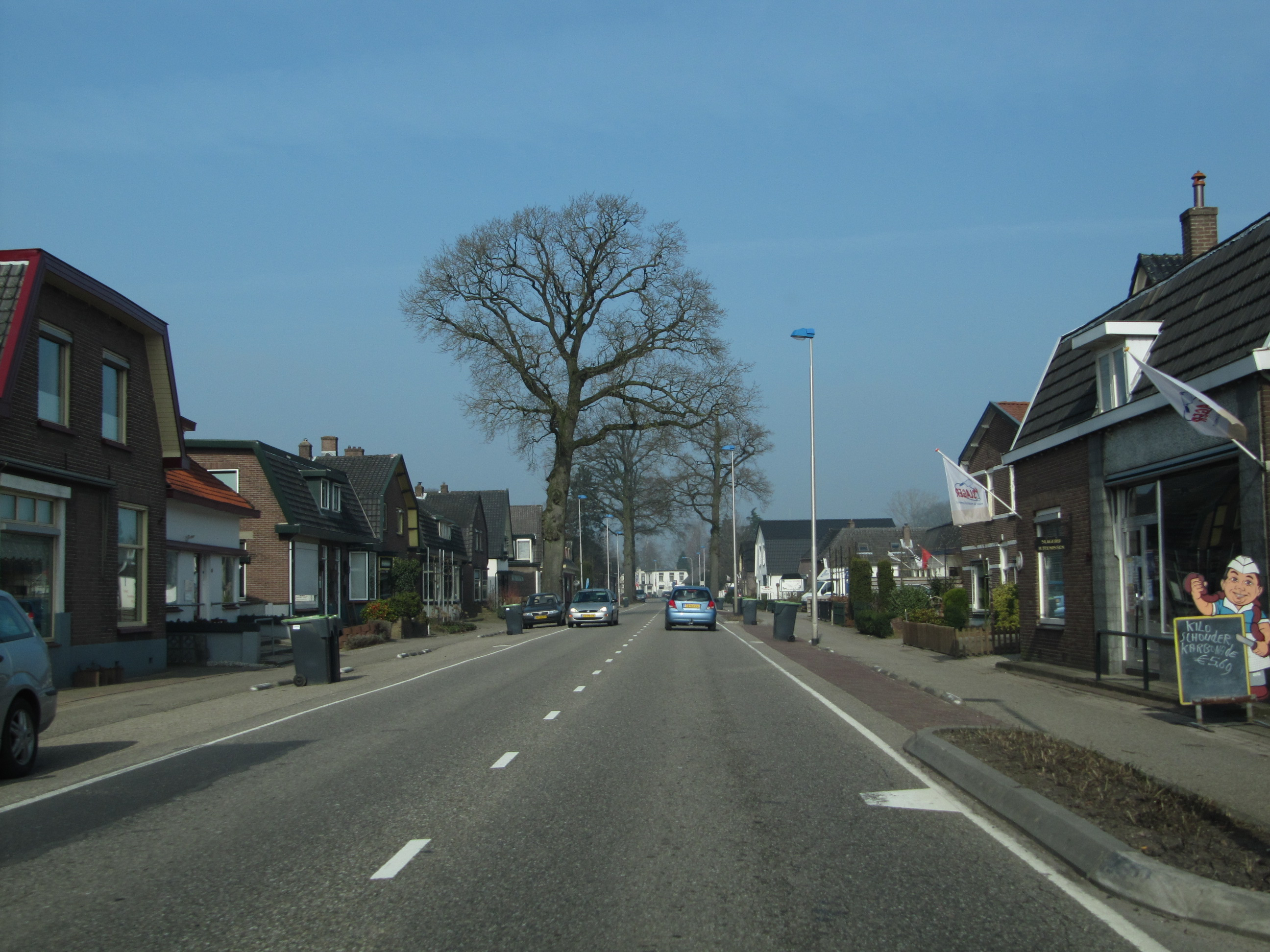
Rijksstraatweg in Voorst (2011). First N49, then Rijksweg 49, now provincial road N345

N49 Zutphen - Voorst - Apeldoorn

N50 Arnhem - Apeldoorn - Epe - Hattem

N51 Rheden - Doesburg - Doetinchem - Winterswijk - Haaksbergen - Enschede

N52 Arnhem - Elst - Nijmegen

N53 Ubbergen - Nijmegen - Beuningen - Druten - Tiel - Geldermalsen

N54 Bois le Duc - Waalwijk - Geertruidenberg - Zevenbergen - Willemstad

N55 Bois le Duc - Rosmalen - Heesch - Grave - Nijmegen

N56 Flushing - Middelburg - Kortgene - Sint Maartensdijk - Tholen - Bergen op Zoom

N57 Westenschouwen - Brouwershaven - Zierikzee

N58 Flushing - Middelburg - Goes - Kruiningen - Bergen op Zoom

N59 Zierikzee - Bruinisse - Sint Philipsland - Steenbergen

N60 Goes - Terneuzen - Axel - Hulst - Sint Jansteen

N61 Terneuzen - IJzendijke - Oostburg - Sluis

N62 Tilburg - Waalwijk - Drunen - Heusden - Woudrichem - Gorinchem

N63 Bergen op Zoom - Roosendaal - Princenhage - Breda - Rijen - Tilburg - Oirschot - Best - Eindhoven

N64 Bois le Duc - Vught - Boxtel - Best - Eindhoven

N65 Vught - Helvoirt - Berkel Enschot - Tilburg - Goirle

N66 Best - Sint Oedenrode - Veghel - Uden - Grave

N67 Eindhoven - Veldhoven - Eersel - Reusel

N68 Eindhoven - Geldrop - Heeze - Weert - Roermond

N69 Eindhoven - Aalst - Valkenswaard - Borkel en Schaft

N70 Eindhoven - Geldrop - Helmond - Asten - Helden - Venlo

N71 Nijmegen - Gennep - Venlo

N72 Venlo - Tegelen - Roermond

N73 Grave - Cuijk - Boxmeer - Venraij - Maasbree - Haelen - Ittervoort

N74 Roermond - Maasniel

N75 Roermond - Echt - Sittard - Geleen - Maastricht

N76 Sittard - Hoensbroek - Heerlen

N77 Heerlen - Kerkrade

N78 Maastricht - Heer - Margraten - Vaals

N79 Maastricht - Meerssen - Valkenburg - Voerendaal - Heerlen

N80 Maastricht - Heer - Eijsden

N81 Maastricht - Oud Vroenhoven (southbound)

N82 Maastricht - Oud Vroenhoven (northbound)

=== Modern additions (never signposted) ===
N83 Almere - Zeewolde - Dronten

N84 Hoorn - Enkhuizen - Lelystad - Harderwijk

N85 Purmerend - Almere (planned route into the discontinued Markerwaard polder)

The numbers 86, 87 and 88 are vacant, while 89 to 100 were used for the National N-Road route numbers.

== See also ==
- Roads in the Netherlands

== Other sources ==
Part of this article is translated from the Dutch Wikipedia page on this topic, retrieved on 14 July 2014: Rijksstraatweg - Wikipedia.
It lists two (Dutch language) paper sources, but lacks inline citations:

- Blok, D.P. e.a. red. (1981), De Algemene Geschiedenis der Nederlanden, deel 10, Bussum: Unieboek
- Frankema, Ewout en Peter Groote, De modernisering van het Nederlandse wegennet. Nieuwe perspectieven op de ontwikkeling voor 1940, NEHA deel 65 (2002) 305-328
