= Huisseling en Neerloon =

Former municipality in the Netherlands

Coordinates: 51.787382°N 5.659161°E

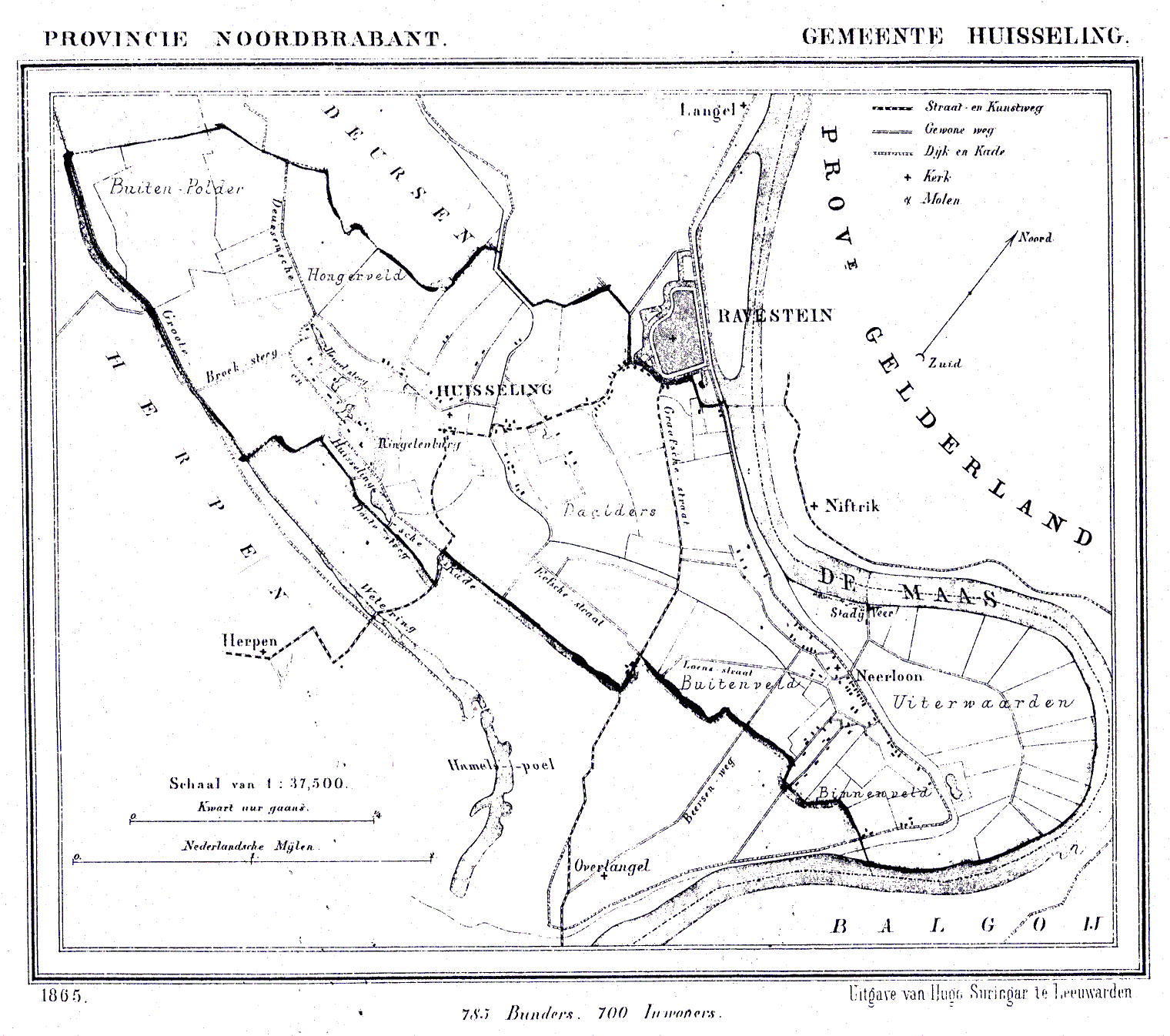
An 1865 map of Huisseling

Huisseling en Neerloon is a former municipality in the Dutch province of North Brabant. It covered the villages of Huisseling and Neerloon.

Huisseling en Neerloon merged with Ravenstein in 1923.
