= National Road network (Netherlands) =

Former road number system in the Netherlands

Nationale Wegen (National Highways) or simply N-wegen (N-roads), was a numbering system for a set of main highway routes in the Netherlands, used from 1957 through 1976.

In 1957, signposted road numbering was introduced in the Netherlands and the governments Rijkswegen plan foresaw in an increasing number of highways, together forming a nationwide system. Alongside the pan-European E-road numbers, which were given to routes of international importance, a complementing series of N-road numbers was devised to designate those routes not included in the European system, but considered of national significance.

In 1976, the until then administrative only Rijksweg numbers were adopted as the new road denominations, along with a completely new series of N-numbers for Non motorway highways, in 1978. The original brown N-numbers on road-signs were since then replaced with red A-numbers, for Dutch motorways, and new yellow N-numbers for other highways.
The E-road system was significantly renumbered in 1985, but remains signposted everywhere in the Netherlands.

For this road system the numbers 89 to 100 were used. This is because the numbers leading up to 85 were used for the original Rijksstraatwegen and later the modern rijkswegen count.

== Original N-highway routes ==
N89 "The Wadden Sea Route", length: 200 km
Amsterdam - Delfzijl (via Alkmaar, Leeuwarden and Groningen)

N90 "The Frisia Route", length: 130 km
Leeuwarden - Almelo (via Heerenveen and Zwolle)

N91 "The Zuyderzee Route", length: 145 km
Joure - Utrecht (via Lelystad and Hilversum)

N92 "The Lower Saxony Route", length: 185 km
Eemshaven - Enschede (via Emmen and Hardenberg)

N93 "The Veluwe Route", length: 180 km
Emmeloord - Tilburg (via Apeldoorn, Arnhem, Nijmegen and 's-Hertogenbosch)

N94 "The Central Route", length: 220 km
Hoorn - Valkenswaard (via Lelystad, Ede, Oss and Eindhoven)

N95 "The Upper Meuse Route", length: 140 km
Nijmegen - Maastricht (via Venlo and Heerlen)

N96 "The Rhine Route", 110 km
Maasvlakte - Enschede (two sections, separated by E31 )

N97 "The Lower Meuse Route", length: 135 km
Renesse - 's-Hertogenbosch (via Zierikzee, Steenbergen and Moerdijk)

N98 "The Delta Works Route", length: 160 km
Europoort - Sas van Gent (via Renesse and Flushing)

N99 "The North Sea Route", length: 235 km
Wieringen - Antwerp (via Amsterdam, The Hague, Rotterdam and Bergen op Zoom)

N100 "The IJ Route", length: 55 km (incomplete)
Greater beltway around Amsterdam

== See also ==
- N93 (Netherlands) for a fully detailed example of one of these old routes
- Rijksstraatweg - History of the first Dutch highway network
- Roads in the Netherlands
