= Colyaer Freedom S100 =

Spanish ultralight aircraft

Freedom S100
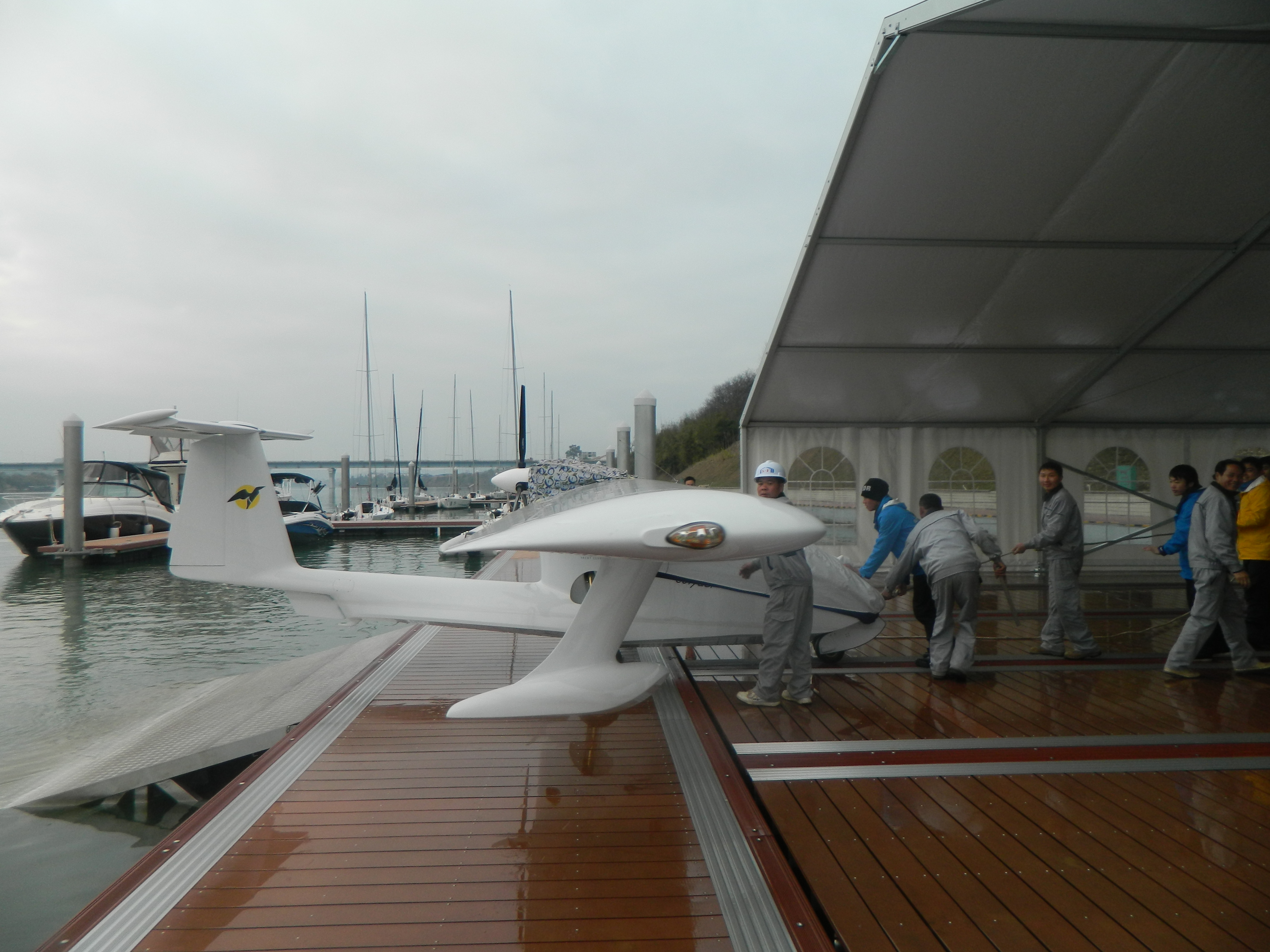

General information
- Type: Ultralight aircraft and Light-sport aircraft
- National origin: Spain
- Manufacturer: Colyaer
- Status: In production

History
- Introduction date: 2006
- Developed from: Colyaer Martin3 S100

The Colyaer Freedom S100 is a Spanish amphibious ultralight and light-sport aircraft, designed and produced by Colyaer of Portonovo.

== Design and development ==
The Freedom was subject to a lengthy eleven-year development process between 1995 and 2006. It was designed to comply with the Fédération Aéronautique Internationale microlight rules and US light-sport aircraft rules. It features a cantilever high-wing, a two-seats-in-side-by-side configuration enclosed cockpit, retractable tricycle landing gear, wing-tip pontoons and a single engine in pusher configuration.

The Freedom is made entirely from carbon fibre, Kevlar and fibreglass composites. Its 12.4 m (40.7 ft) span wing has an area of 12.0 m^{2} (129 sq ft) and flaps that can be deployed for landing and reflexed for cruise flight. The long wingspan gives the Freedom a glide ratio of 20:1 and allows power-off soaring flights. The standard engine is the 100 hp (75 kW) Rotax 912ULS four-stroke powerplant.

In 2015 the aircraft was marketed by Galicia Avionica SL.

== Specifications (Freedom S100) ==
Data from Bayerl

General characteristics

- Crew: one
- Capacity: one passenger
- Wingspan: 12.4 m (40 ft 8 in)
- Wing area: 12.0 m^{2} (129 sq ft)
- Empty weight: 380 kg (838 lb)
- Gross weight: 650 kg (1,433 lb)
- Fuel capacity: 83 litres (18 imp gal; 22 US gal)
- Powerplant: 1 × Rotax 912ULS four cylinder, liquid and air-cooled, four stroke aircraft engine, 75 kW (101 hp)

Performance

- Maximum speed: 230 km/h (140 mph, 120 kn)
- Cruise speed: 190 km/h (120 mph, 100 kn)
- Stall speed: 70 km/h (43 mph, 38 kn)
- Rate of climb: 5 m/s (980 ft/min)
- Wing loading: 54.2 kg/m^{2} (11.1 lb/sq ft)
