= Colyaer Martin3 S100 =

Spanish ultralight aircraft

Martin3 S100
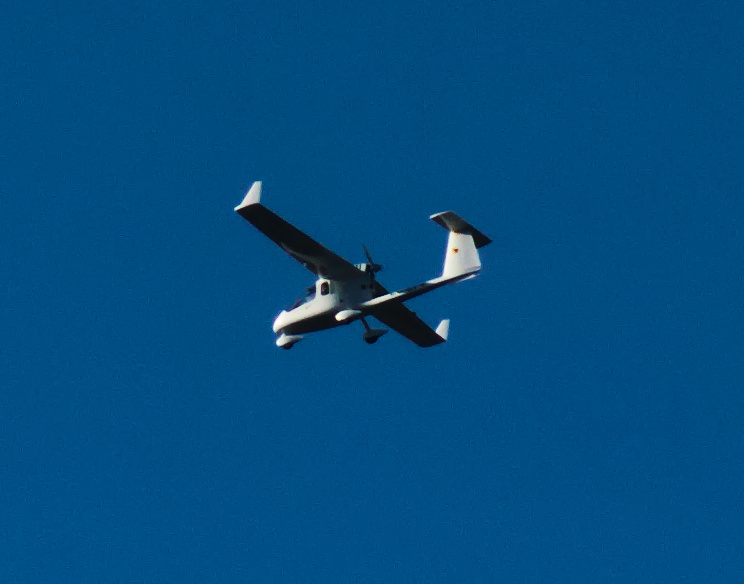

General information
- Type: Ultralight aircraft
- National origin: Spain
- Manufacturer: Colyaer
- Status: In production

History
- Variant: Colyaer Freedom S100

The Colyaer Martin3 S100 is a Spanish ultralight aircraft, designed and produced by Colyaer of Portonovo.

== Design and development ==
The aircraft was designed to comply with the Fédération Aéronautique Internationale microlight rules. It features a cantilever high-wing, a two-seats-in-side-by-side configuration enclosed cockpit, fixed tricycle landing gear and a single engine in pusher configuration.

The aircraft is made from composites. Its 12.4 m (40.7 ft) span wing has an area of 12.0 m^{2} (129 sq ft) and flaps that can be deployed for landing and reflexed for cruise flight. The long wingspan gives the Martin3 a glide ratio of 23:1 and allows power-off soaring flights. The standard engine is the 100 hp (75 kW) Rotax 912ULS four-stroke powerplant.

In 2015 the aircraft was marketed by Galicia Avionica SL.

== Specifications (Martin3 S100) ==
Data from Bayerl

General characteristics

- Crew: one
- Capacity: one passenger
- Wingspan: 12.4 m (40 ft 8 in)
- Wing area: 12.0 m^{2} (129 sq ft)
- Empty weight: 280 kg (617 lb)
- Gross weight: 450 kg (992 lb)
- Fuel capacity: 140 litres (31 imp gal; 37 US gal)
- Powerplant: 1 × Rotax 912ULS four cylinder, liquid and air-cooled, four stroke aircraft engine, 75 kW (101 hp)

Performance

- Maximum speed: 260 km/h (160 mph, 140 kn)
- Cruise speed: 180 km/h (110 mph, 97 kn)
- Stall speed: 65 km/h (40 mph, 35 kn)
- Rate of climb: 5 m/s (980 ft/min)
- Wing loading: 37.5 kg/m^{2} (7.7 lb/sq ft)
