= Portonovo =

Coordinates: 42.3925°N 8.82361°W

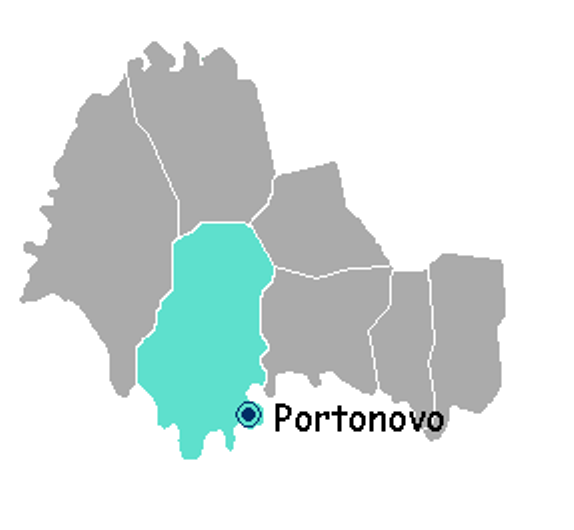
Municipality map of Sanxenxo.

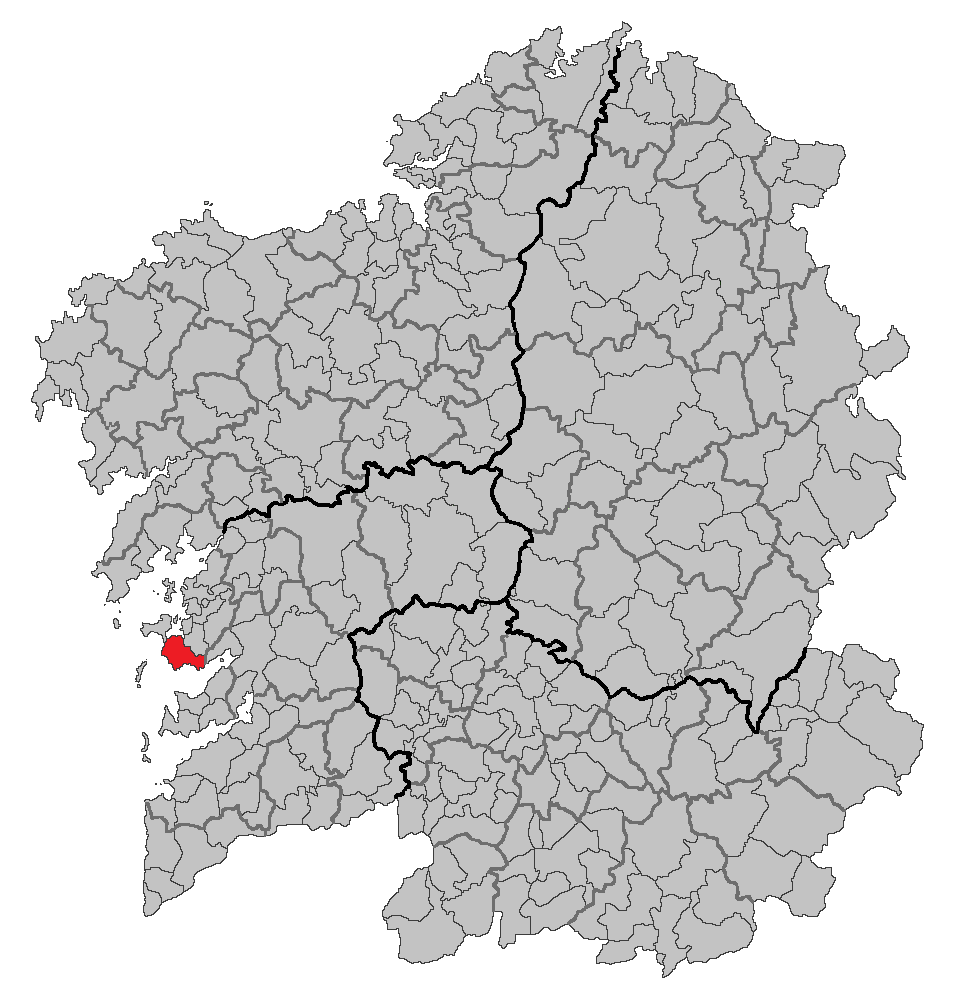
Location in Galicia, Spain,

Portonovo is a fishing village and tourist center within the municipality of Sanxenxo. It belongs to the parish of Adina. Situated in the Ria de Pontevedra, its climate is cold and rainy in winter and warm and sunny in summer. Tourism is the main economic engine of the town, and the temporary population in the summer months increases considerably. Three beaches are found along the coast for the town: Portonovo Beach (also known as Baltar Beach), Caneliñas and Canelas.

Portonovo also thrives economically on the nightlife in the summer and holiday periods. The village has many local pubs, cafés and nightclubs.
