= Rhinechis =

Rhinechis can mean:

- A synonym for the genus Vipera, the old world vipers
- Rhinechis, the monotypic genus for the Ladder snake
