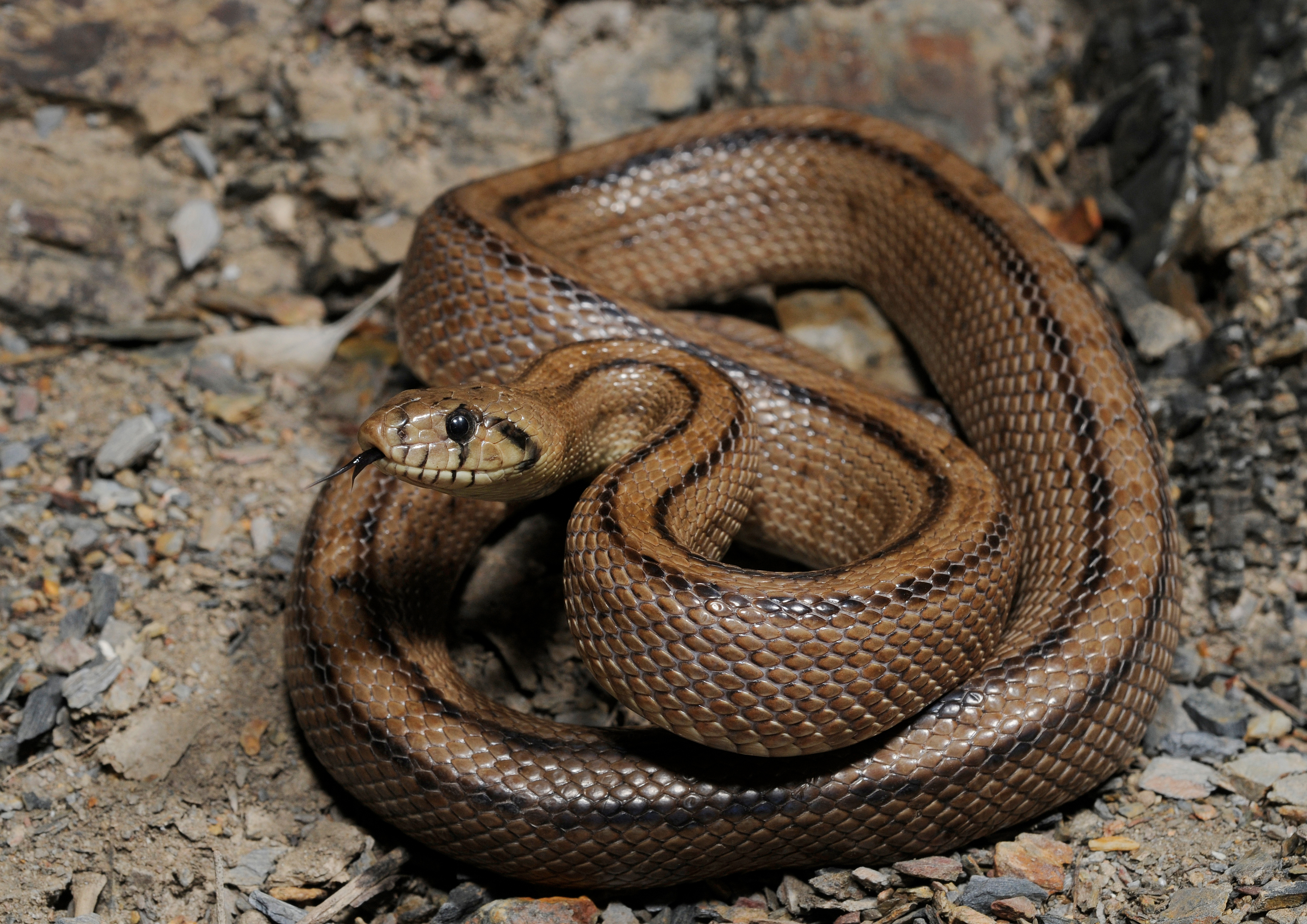

Conservation status
- Least Concern (IUCN 3.1)

Scientific classification
- Kingdom: Animalia
- Phylum: Chordata
- Class: Reptilia
- Order: Squamata
- Suborder: Serpentes
- Family: Colubridae
- Genus: Zamenis
- Species: Z. scalaris

Binomial name
- Zamenis scalaris (Schinz, 1822)
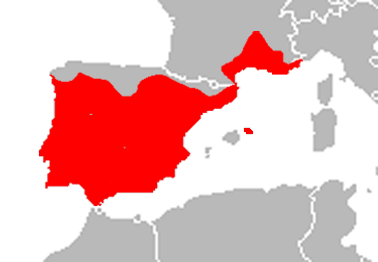
- Range map

Synonyms
- Coluber scalaris Schinz, 1822; Xenodon michahelles Schlegel, 1837; Rhinechis scalaris — A.M.C. Duméril, Bibron & A.H.A. Duméril, 1854; Elaphe scalaris — Kahl et al., 1980; Zamenis scalaris — Zaher et al., 2012

= Ladder snake =

Species of snake

The ladder snake (Zamenis scalaris) is a species of non-venomous snake in the subfamily Colubrinae of the family Colubridae. The species is native to southwestern Europe.

== Distribution ==
The geographic range of the ladder snake includes Portugal, Spain, southern France and just into Italy, also Menorca and the Iles d'Hyères off Provence, but it is absent from northern Iberia including much of the Pyrenees, Galicia (although the species is found on Ons Island, in the Atlantic Islands of Galicia National Park), Cantabria and the Basque Country. The population on Menorca may stem from an introduction by humans.

== Habitat ==
The ladder snake enjoys scrub bushy cover, including orchards, vineyards, hedges and overgrown dry-stone walls; it is common in the maquis. Habitats with stones and boulders and low shade are preferred. Although known at altitudes over 2,000 metres (6,600 ft), this is a species which prefers altitudes from sea level to 700 metres (2,300 ft).

== Description ==
The ladder snake is a medium-sized snake which reaches a maximum total length (tail included) of around 160 cm (63 in) but which averages 120 cm (47 in) in total length. It has a pointed snout. As an adult the ladder snake is less variable than many related snake species. Dorsally, it is yellowish to dark brown, with two darker stripes running down the length of the body from neck to tail. It normally also has a dark stripe running from the rear of the eye to the angle of the jaw and sometime subtle, darker markings on the sides. The ventral side is pale, varying from a silvery-grey to whitish, with the occasional dark spot. The eye is dark. The juvenile snakes have lighter and brighter colouration, varying from yellow to light brown, with the characteristic "ladder" pattern in black along the upperside. The pale underside has black markings which sometimes coalesce to cover the whole of the underside. As the snake ages these colours and patterns fade until the simpler adult pattern is left.

== Diet ==
Like other "rat snakes", the majority of the ladder snake's prey is mammals such as mice, rabbits and shrews, making up 75% of prey items with a further quarter being spiders, insects (especially grasshoppers) and a few birds. To prey on birds the ladder snake will climb to search for active nests in trees or on man-made structures. Lizards are also eaten. Juvenile ladder snakes prefer small lizards, baby rodents, spiders, and grasshoppers.

== Behaviour ==
The ladder snake is normally active by day, but during the hottest summer months it may be nocturnal, while in the spring months it may be more crepuscular. Its behaviour is said to be more like that of whipsnakes rather than that of rat snakes. It is more aggressive and defensive than most of the species formerly classified alongside it in the genus Elaphe. Defensive signals include hissing and lunging forward with the mouth open. Any attempt to pick up a ladder snake may be greeted by sharp bites and also the emptying of the cloacal glands, releasing an offensive odour.

It is a more mobile snake than many of its relatives and movements of up to 100 m (330 ft) per day have been recorded, while the average home territory of an individual is 4,500 m^{2} (48,438 ft^{2}). Adults may enter barns or similar buildings in search of rodent prey, but they do not normally use such places for shelter and prefer rodent burrows, piles of stones or hollow trees.

== Breeding ==
In Iberia ladder snake courtship occurs during May and June, however some females do not breed every year. Copulation lasts around an hour, and a clutch with an average size of 15 eggs (varies between 4 and 24 eggs) is laid 3–6 weeks after mating. Hatching occurs after a period of between 5 and 12 weeks. The young measure 20 cm (7.9 in) long as hatchlings. Unusually for snakes, their mother may remain with the newly hatched juveniles for a few days. Males and females reach sexual maturity at approximately 5 years of age, when they reach a length of 50 cm (20 in) and 65 cm (26 in), respectively.

== Conservation status ==
The IUCN has rated this species, Zamenis scalaris, as Least Concern. This is a generally abundant species which is tolerant of a wide range of habitats and has a large geographic range.

== Gallery ==
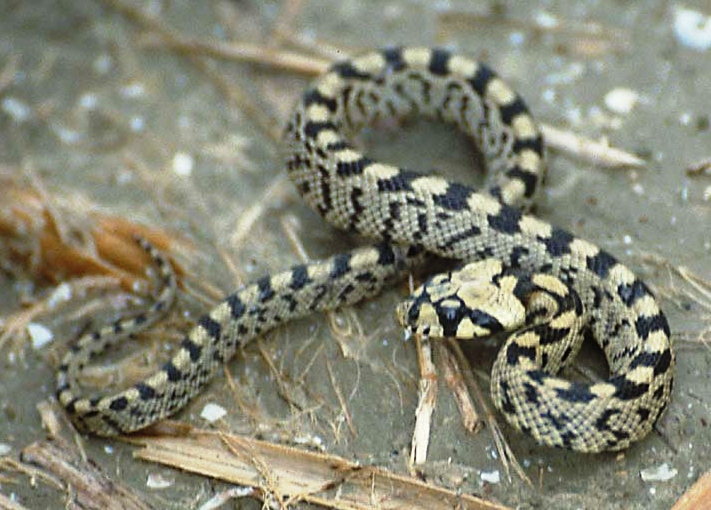
Young Zamenis scalaris in France

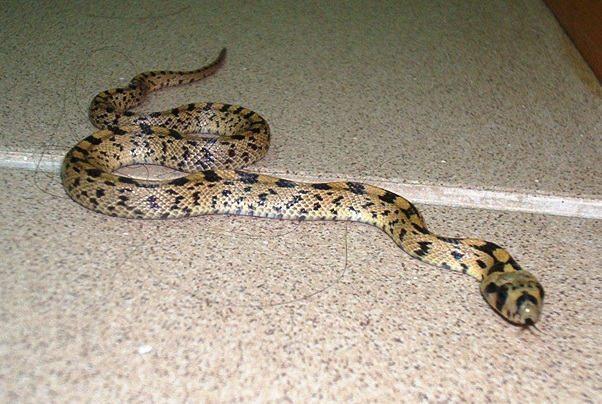

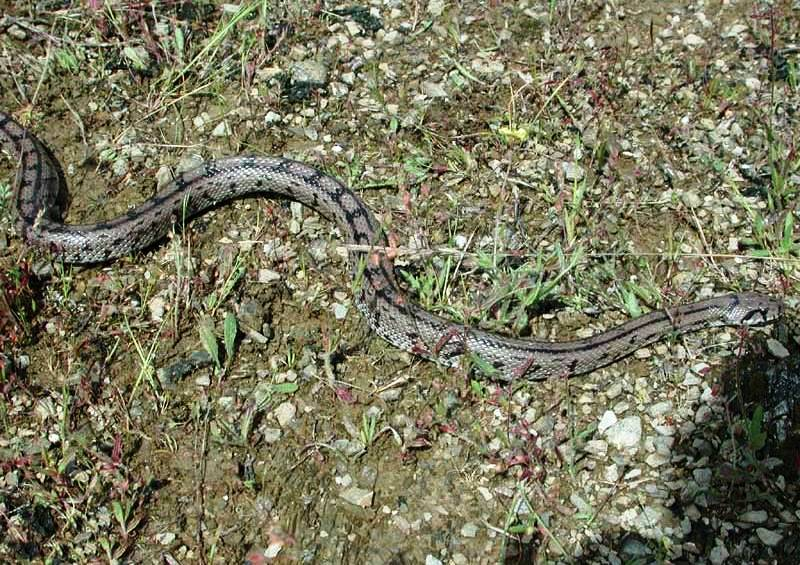

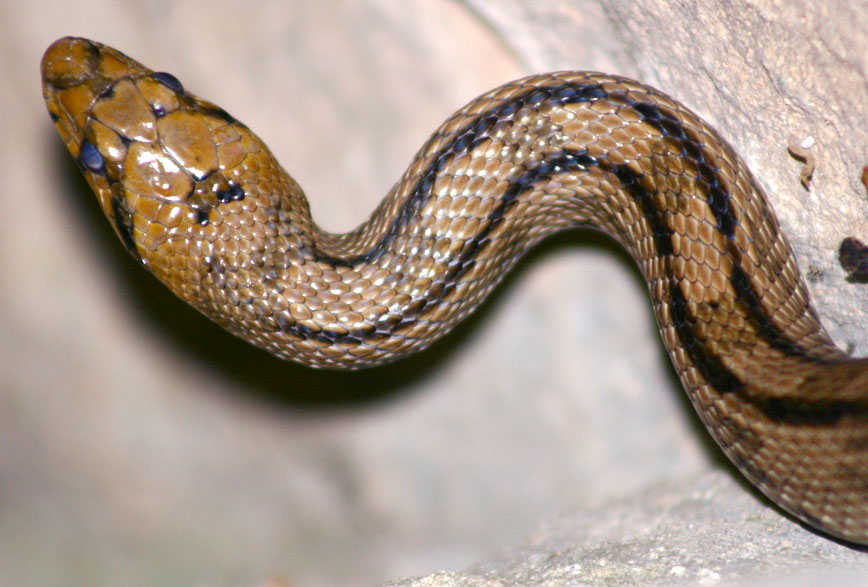

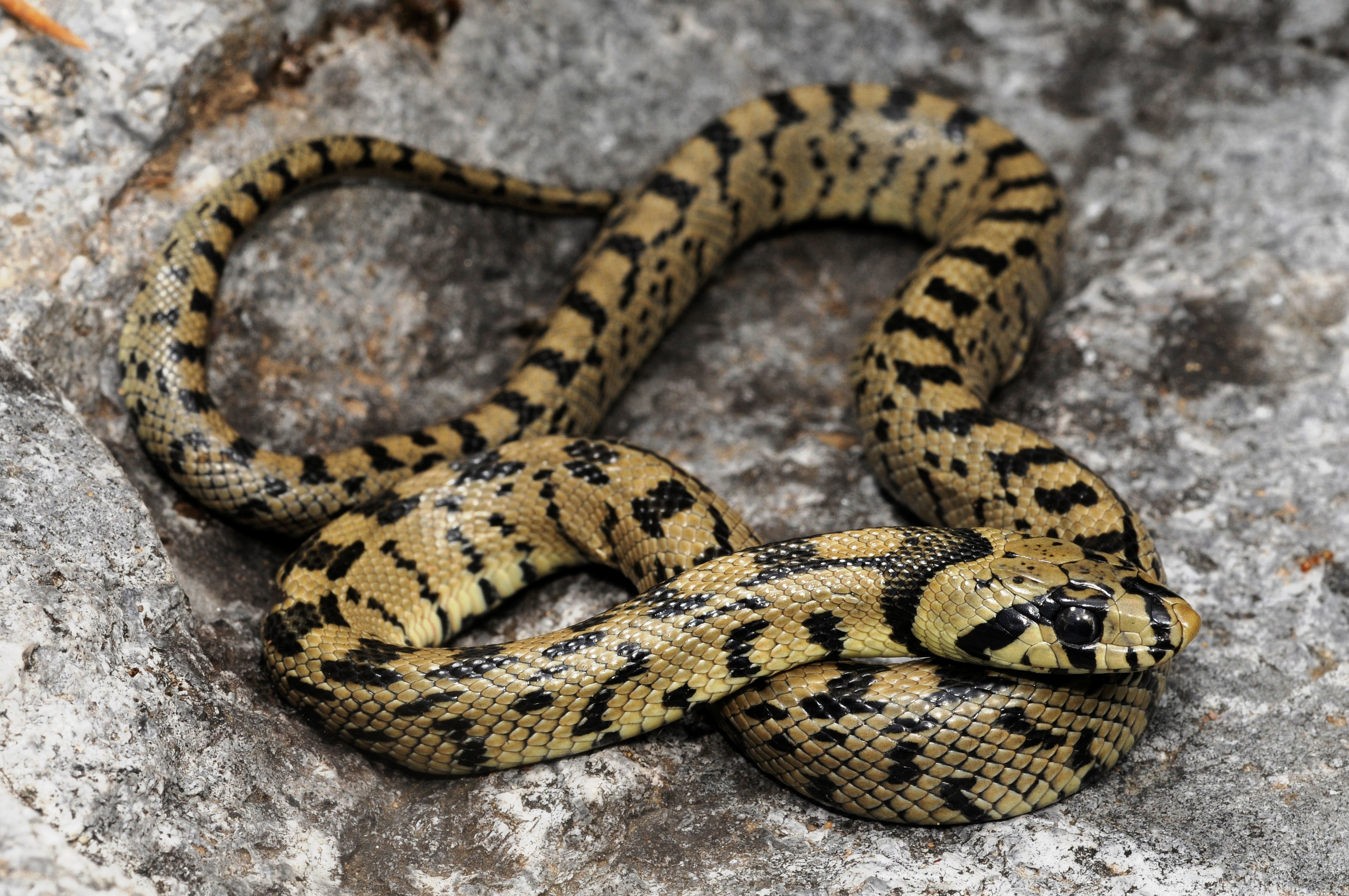
