= Bueu =

- Municipality
- Flag Coat of arms

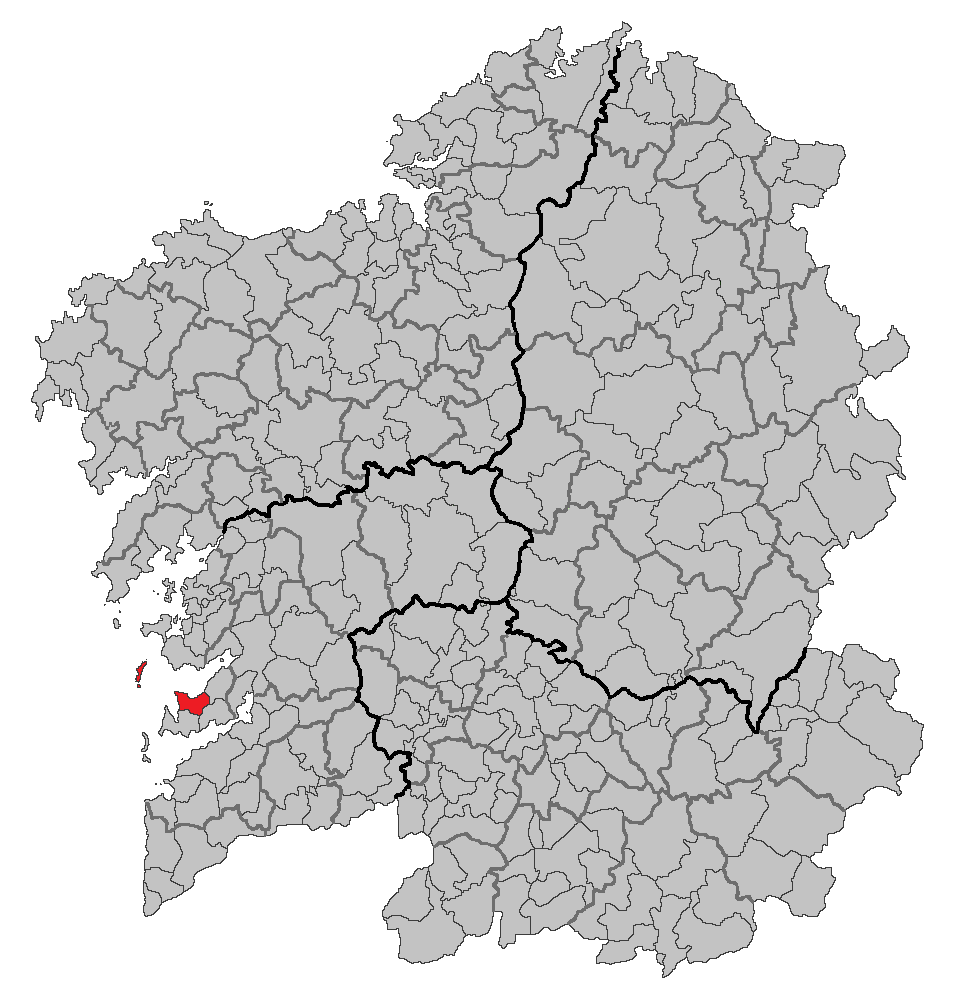
- Situation of Bueu within Galicia

- Location in Spain
- Coordinates: 42°19′N 8°47′W
- Country: Spain
- Autonomous community: Galicia
- Province: Pontevedra
- Comarca: O Morrazo
- Parroquias: Beluso (Santa María), Bueu (San Martín Fuera), Bueu (San Martín), Cela (Santa María), Ermelo (Santiago), Isla de Ons (San Joaquín)

Government
  - Body: Concello de Bueu
  - Alcalde (Mayor): Félix Juncal Novas (BNG)

Area
  - Total: 30.81 km^{2} (11.90 sq mi)

Population (2025-01-01)
  - Total: 11,836
  - Density: 384.2/km^{2} (995.0/sq mi)
- Time zone: UTC+1 (CET)
  - Summer (DST): UTC+2 (CEST)
- Website: www.concellodebueu.org

Bueu is a municipality in Galicia, Spain, in the province of Pontevedra. Bueu belongs to the Comarca of O Morrazo together with Cangas do Morrazo, Moaña and Marín. It is located on the northern edge of the Morrazo peninsula.

Isla de Ons and its small archipelago, part of the Atlantic Islands of Galicia National Park, belong administratively to Bueu.

== History ==
There is evidence of archaeological finds dating back from the Paleolithic period. The forts on the island of Ons, Castrillon (Meiro), Bon (Beluso) and A Cividade are all of the Bronze Age. Subsequently, are the Roman settlements of Pescadoira (recently excavated) and Meiro, with the altar stones dedicated to the Lares road.

Only by the age of the temples in Bueu we can approach the time when it became a parish. It is known that Bueu had a temple before the fourteenth century. In Beluso there is data concerning a cession in 1008. The Church of Cela is from the twelfth century. The old Hermelo priory had a temple in the twelfth century.

== Etymology ==
As for the etymology of Bueu there are various opinions, but believed to be the closest is "marshy terrain".

== Sights ==
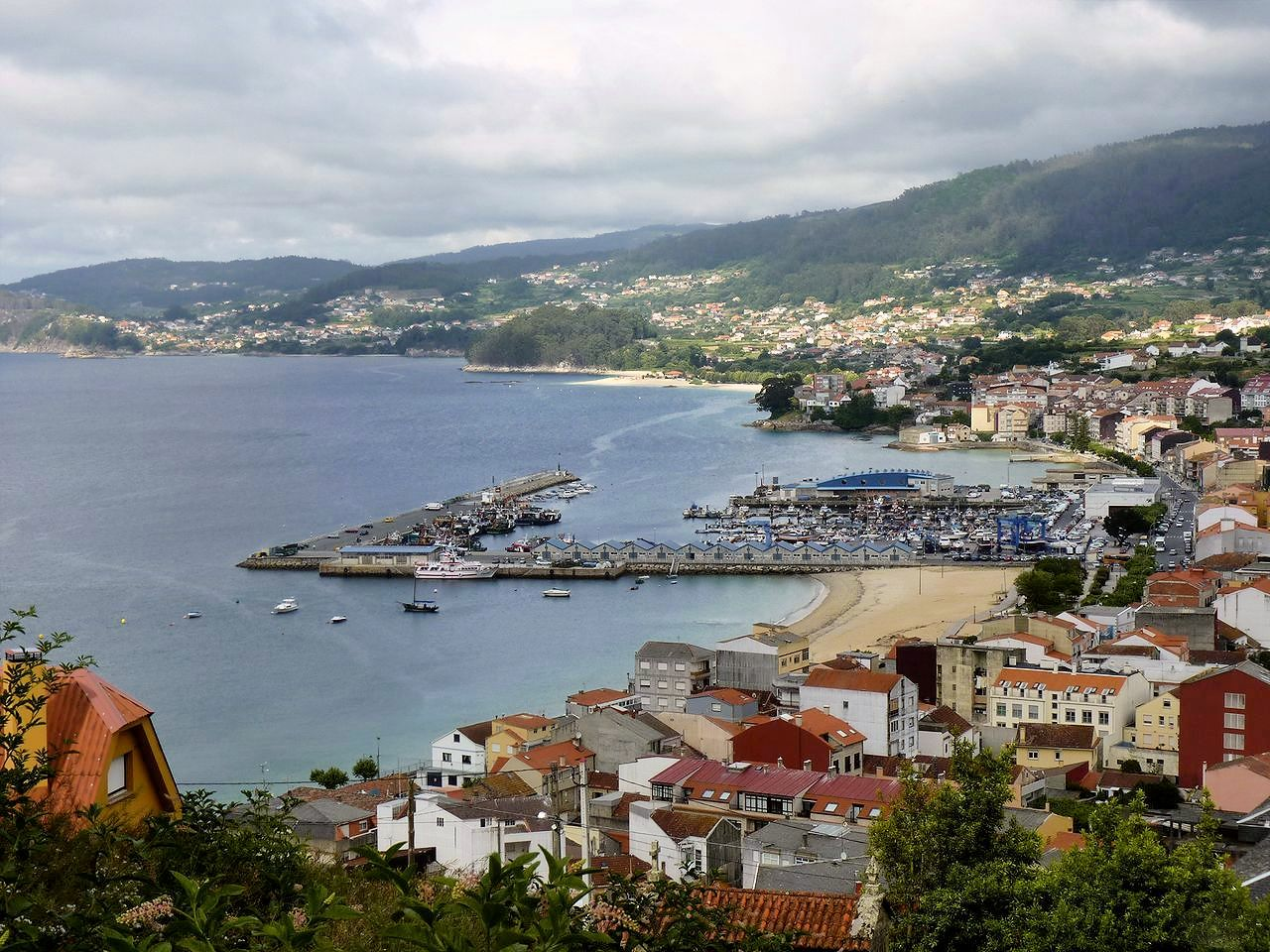
Bueu

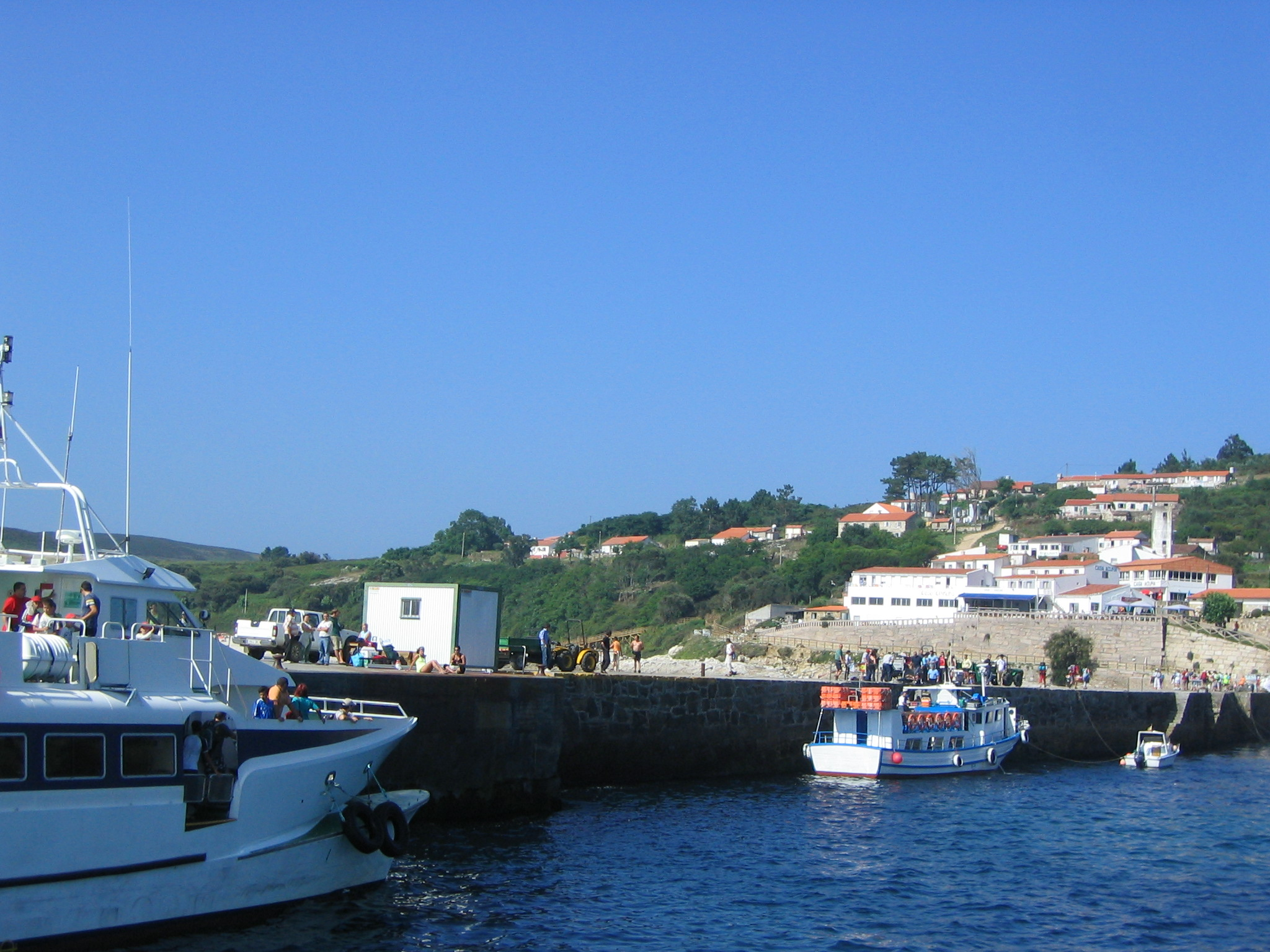
Ons

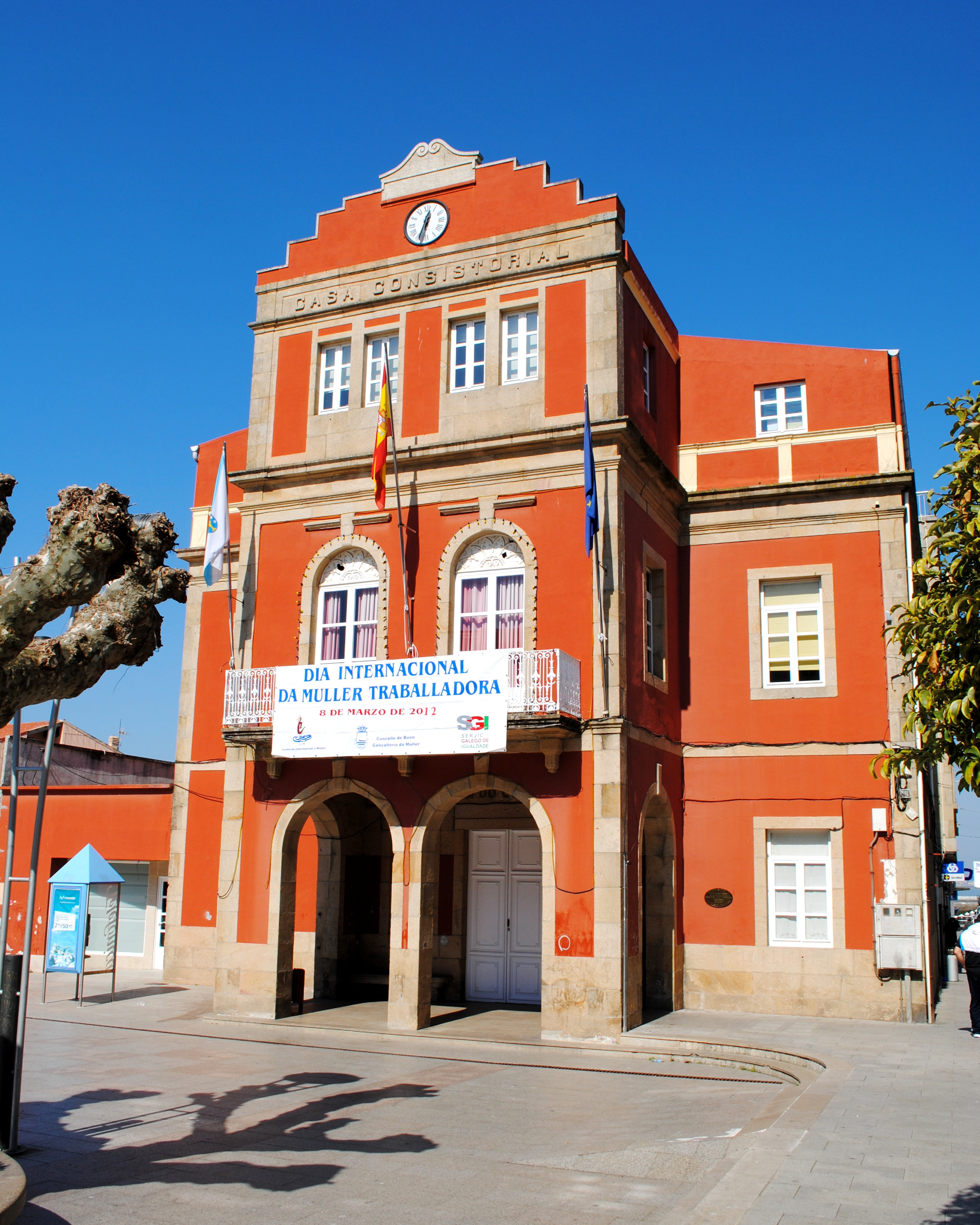
Town Hall

== See also ==
- List of municipalities in Pontevedra
