= Atlantic Islands of Galicia National Park =

National park in Galicia, Spain

Atlantic Islands of Galicia
- Illas Atlánticas de Galicia
- IUCN category II (national park)
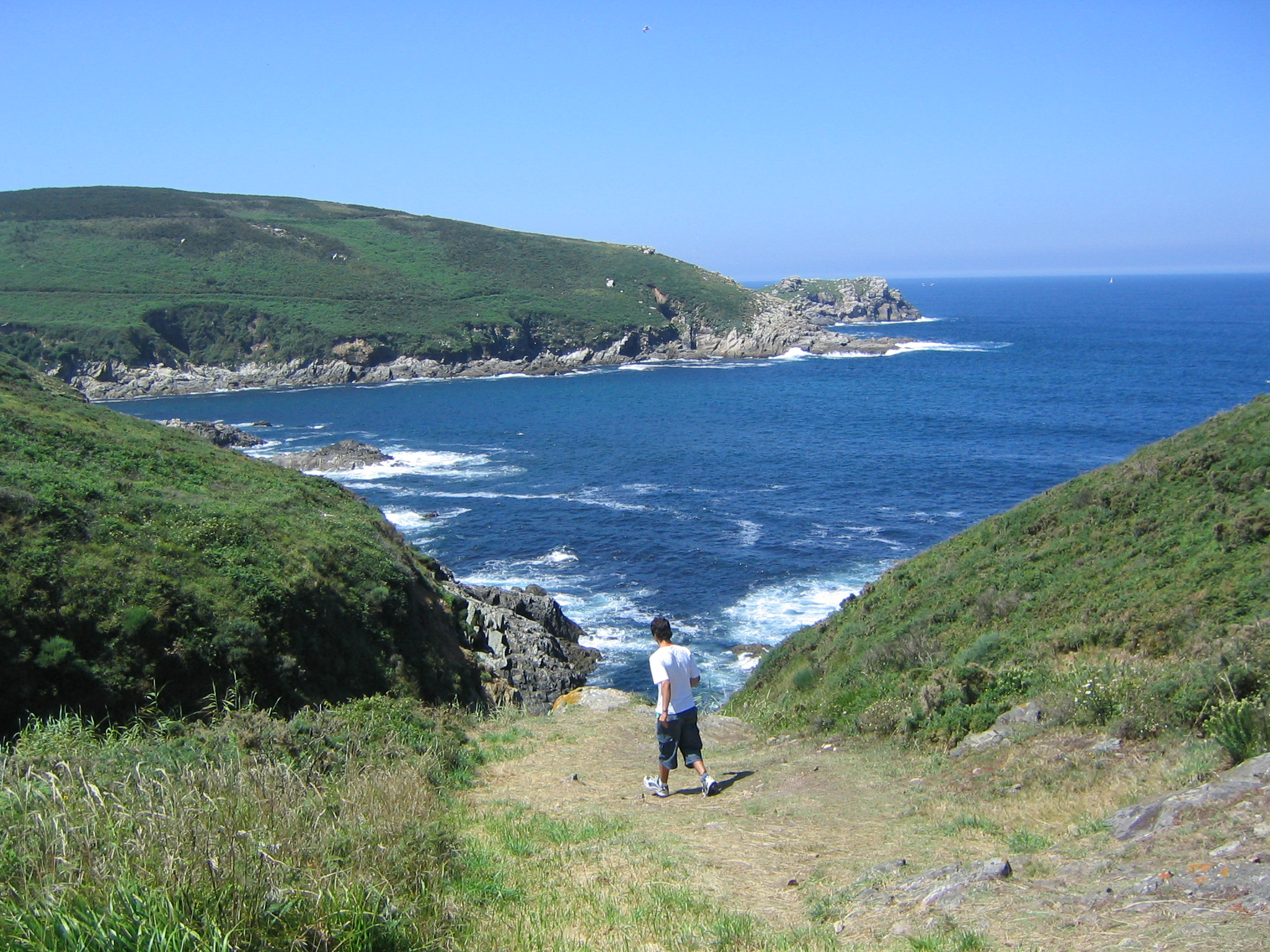
- Ons Archipelago
- Location of the Atlantic Islands of Galicia National Park
- Location: Pontevedra, Galicia, Spain
- Nearest city: Vigo, Pontevedra
- Coordinates: 42°23′N 8°56′W
- Area: 8,480 hectares (84.8 km^{2}; 32.7 sq mi)
- Established: July 1, 2002
- Visitors: 472,274 (in 2019)

Ramsar Wetland
- Official name: Parque Nacional Marítimo-Terrestre de las Islas Atlánticas de Galicia
- Designated: 22 May 2021
- Reference no.: 2453

The Atlantic Islands of Galicia National Park (Galician: Parque Nacional das Illas Atlánticas de Galicia, Spanish: Parque Nacional de las Islas Atlánticas de Galicia) is the only national park located in the province of Pontevedra, in the autonomous community of Galicia, Spain. It comprises the archipelagos of Cíes, Ons, Sálvora and Cortegada. The park covers a land area of 1,200 ha (3,000 acres) and a sea area of 7,200 ha (18,000 acres). It is the tenth most visited national park in Spain. It was the thirteenth national park to be established in Spain. Since 2021 it has been designated as a protected Ramsar site.

== Geography ==
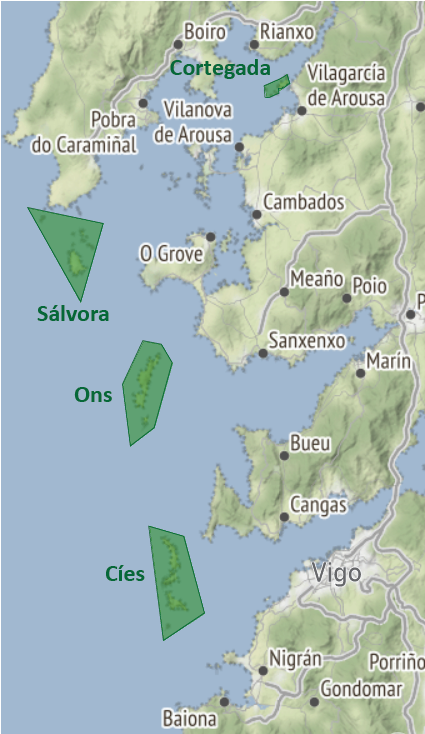
Limits of the National Park surrounding the four archipelagos

The islands of the park are located in the continental platform of the Galician Rías Baixas. The archipelagos of Cortegada and Sálvora are located in the inner and outer areas of the Ría de Arousa, respectively. The Ons archipelago, formed mainly by the Ons and Onza islands, are located at the entrance of the Ría de Pontevedra. Similarly, the Cíes Islands surround the entrance of the Ría de Vigo and comprise the islands Monteagudo, Montefaro and San Martiño.

The 8,480 ha of the national park are distributed as follows:

| Archipelago | Sea area (ha) | Land area (ha) | Highest elevation (m) |
|---|---|---|---|
| Cíes | 2,658 | 433 | 197 |
| Cortegada | 147.2 | 43.8 | 19 |
| Ons | 2,171 | 470 | 119 |
| Sálvora | 2,309 | 248 | 73 |

== Geology ==
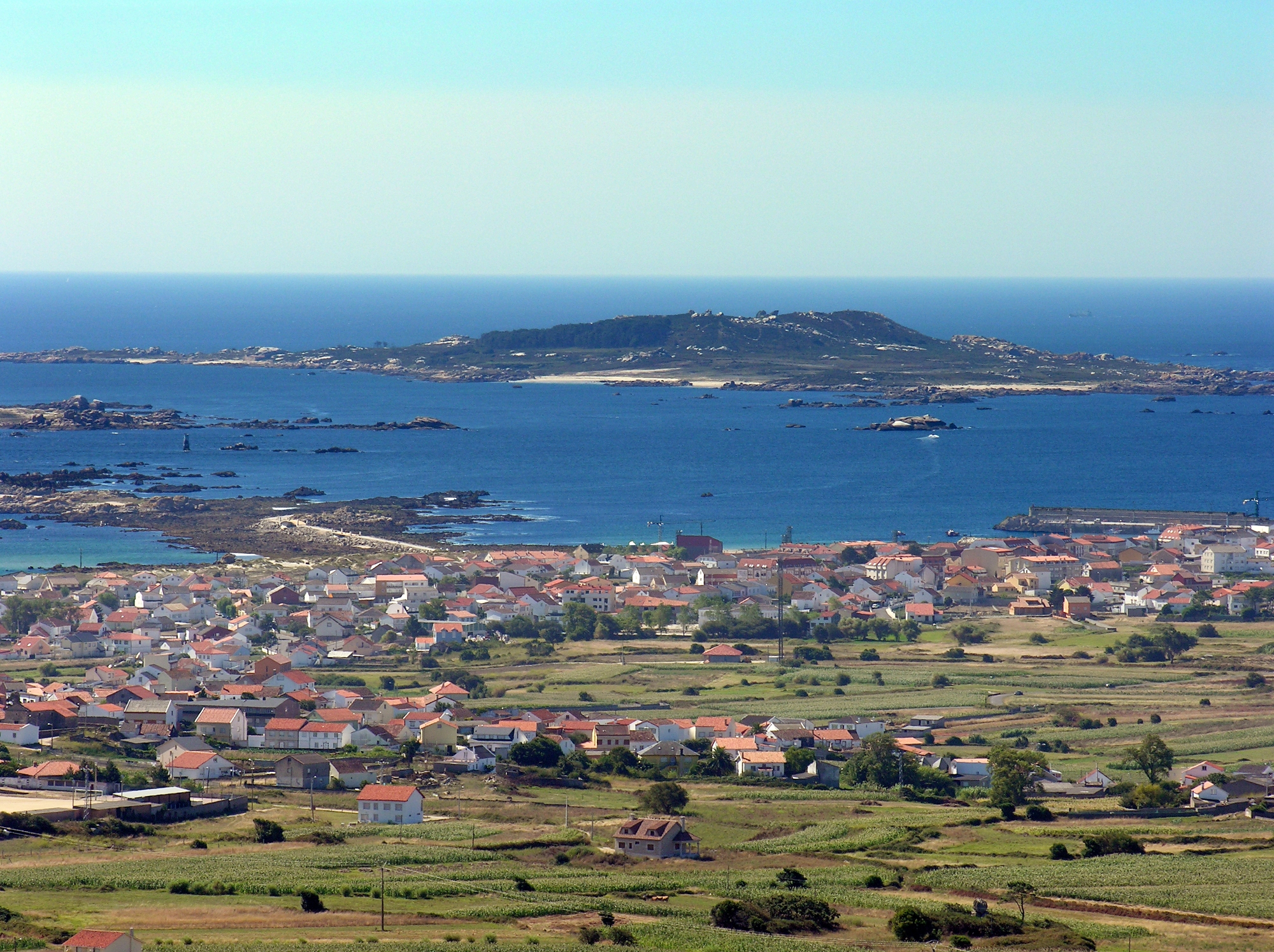
Salvora and nearby village of Aguiño

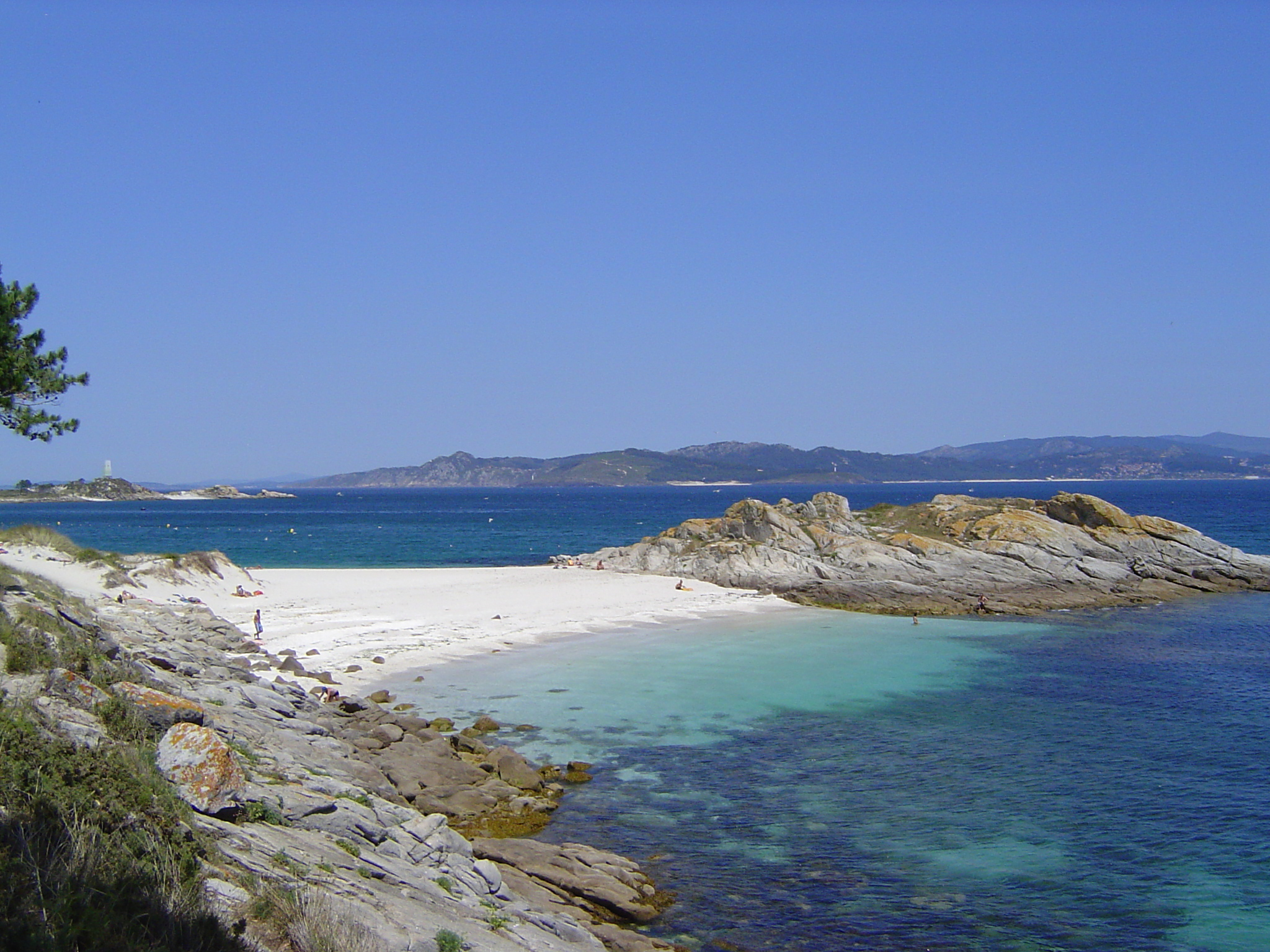
Viños beach in Cíes

The geological history of the islands dates back to the Palaeozoic era, when the geological materials which currently form the land and marine areas of the park were formed. The geological composition of the Archipelagos of Cíes, Ons and Sálvora is of granitic nature, although in the first two the predominant parent rock is two-mica gneiss-granite, while in Sálvora the predominant material is coarse-grained amphibole-biotite late granodiorite. Cortegada, meanwhile, presents a composition that is predominantly of metamorphic rock shale and paragneiss, with migmatic granite.

== Climate ==
Although located in a region of oceanic climate, most of the islands of the park present a sub-humid mediterranean climate of Atlantic tendency. Rain is less abundant than in the nearby coast due to the low altitude of the islands, which represents a minimal obstacle for passing clouds. The annual precipitation in Cíes is 1,000 mm/year, while Ons and Sálvora receive 1,500 mm/year. In the summer, precipitation becomes rare. Cortegada, due to its location in the inside of the estuary close to the coast, presents an oceanic climate, with a rainfall of 2000 mm/year. The average annual temperature oscillates in a range of 13-15 °C with little seasonal variability, with dominant winds from the North in the summer months and from the Southwest in winter.

Climate data for Cíes islands (modelled)
| Month | Jan | Feb | Mar | Apr | May | Jun | Jul | Aug | Sep | Oct | Nov | Dec | Year |
|---|---|---|---|---|---|---|---|---|---|---|---|---|---|
| Mean daily maximum °C (°F) | 12 (54) | 13 (55) | 15 (59) | 16 (61) | 19 (66) | 22 (72) | 24 (75) | 25 (77) | 23 (73) | 19 (66) | 15 (59) | 13 (55) | 18 (64) |
| Mean daily minimum °C (°F) | 7 (45) | 6 (43) | 7 (45) | 8 (46) | 10 (50) | 12 (54) | 14 (57) | 14 (57) | 14 (57) | 12 (54) | 9 (48) | 7 (45) | 10 (50) |
| Average precipitation mm (inches) | 182 (7.2) | 124 (4.9) | 122 (4.8) | 114 (4.5) | 86 (3.4) | 49 (1.9) | 29 (1.1) | 34 (1.3) | 68 (2.7) | 176 (6.9) | 170 (6.7) | 187 (7.4) | 1,341 (52.8) |
Source: MeteoBlue

== Flora and fauna ==
This sea-land ecosystem has a laurel forest and over 200 species of seaweed. It also stands out for its shellfish, corals and anemones.

Among the bird species, those that are particularly significant due to their threat level are the European Storm Petrel (Hydrobates pelagicus), whose nesting colony could make up 1% of the Spanish Atlantic population, or the overwintering Balearic Shearwater (Puffinus mauretanicus) and the Eurasian curlew (Numenius arquata) included in the Spanish Catalogue of Endangered Species as Endangered. The presence of the Yellow-legged Gull (Larus cachinnans michahellis) is especially noteworthy; it is a migratory species, whose populational estimates in the Atlantic Islands of Galicia make up 7-15% of the population worldwide, and a third of the Spanish population; or the presence of the European Shag (Phalacrocorax aristotelis), included in the category of Vulnerable in the Spanish Catalogue of Endangered Species and in the Galician Catalogue of Endangered Species, which in this territory has 1-3% of its worldwide population and 78% of its Spanish population.

Regarding the mammals that inhabit the marine environments, a noteworthy fact is the presence of up to 27 species of cetaceans and pinnipeds. The most frequent species are the Common Bottlenose Dolphin (Tursiops truncatus), the Harbour Porpoise (Phocoena phocoena), the Long-finned Pilot Whale (Globicephala melas) and the Short-beaked Common Dolphin (Delphinus delphis).

Additionally, the park sees a regular presence of marine turtles. Among them, the most frequent species is the Loggerhead Sea Turtle (Caretta caretta), along with the Green Sea Turtle (Chelonia mydas), Kemp's Ridley Sea Turtle (Lepidochelys kempii), the Hawksbill Sea Turtle (Eretmochelys imbricata) or the Leatherback Sea Turtle (Dermochelys coriacea).

In the amphibian family, the islands are home to smaller salamanders than in the nearby continent, with distinct reproduction and diurnal activity as an adaptation to insular conditions. Reptiles include Bedriaga's skinks (Chalcides bedriagai) and ocellated lizards (Timon lepidus), and a notable insect is the rare Spanish festoon butterfly (Zerynthia rumina). Mammals are scarce, although there are plenty of rabbits which practically have no predators. In recent years, otters have reappeared.

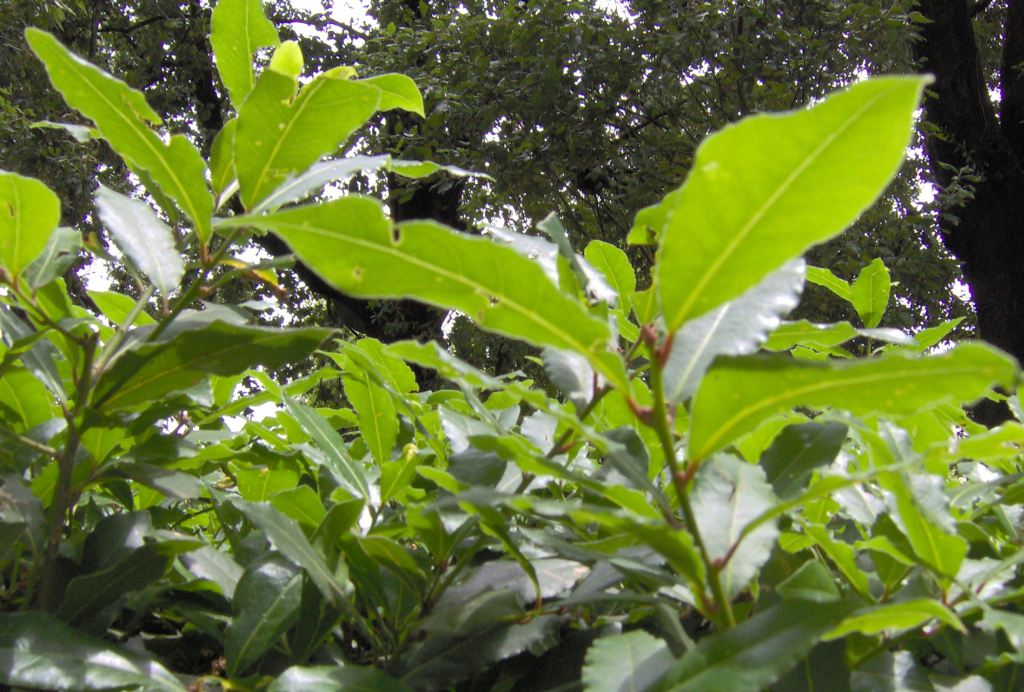
One of Europe's largest bay laurel forests is located in Cortegada Island

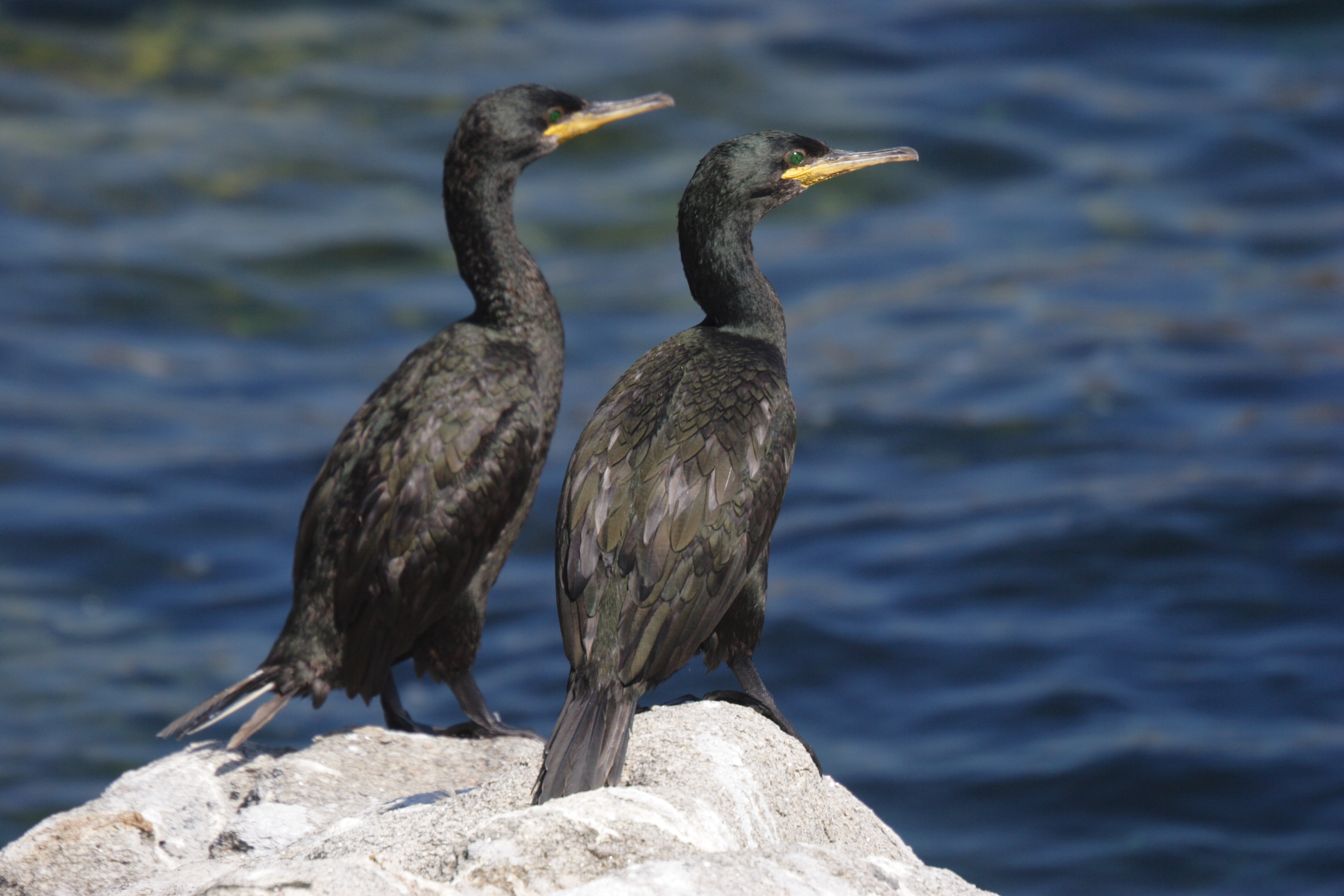
The park is home to the largest colony of European shag in Europe

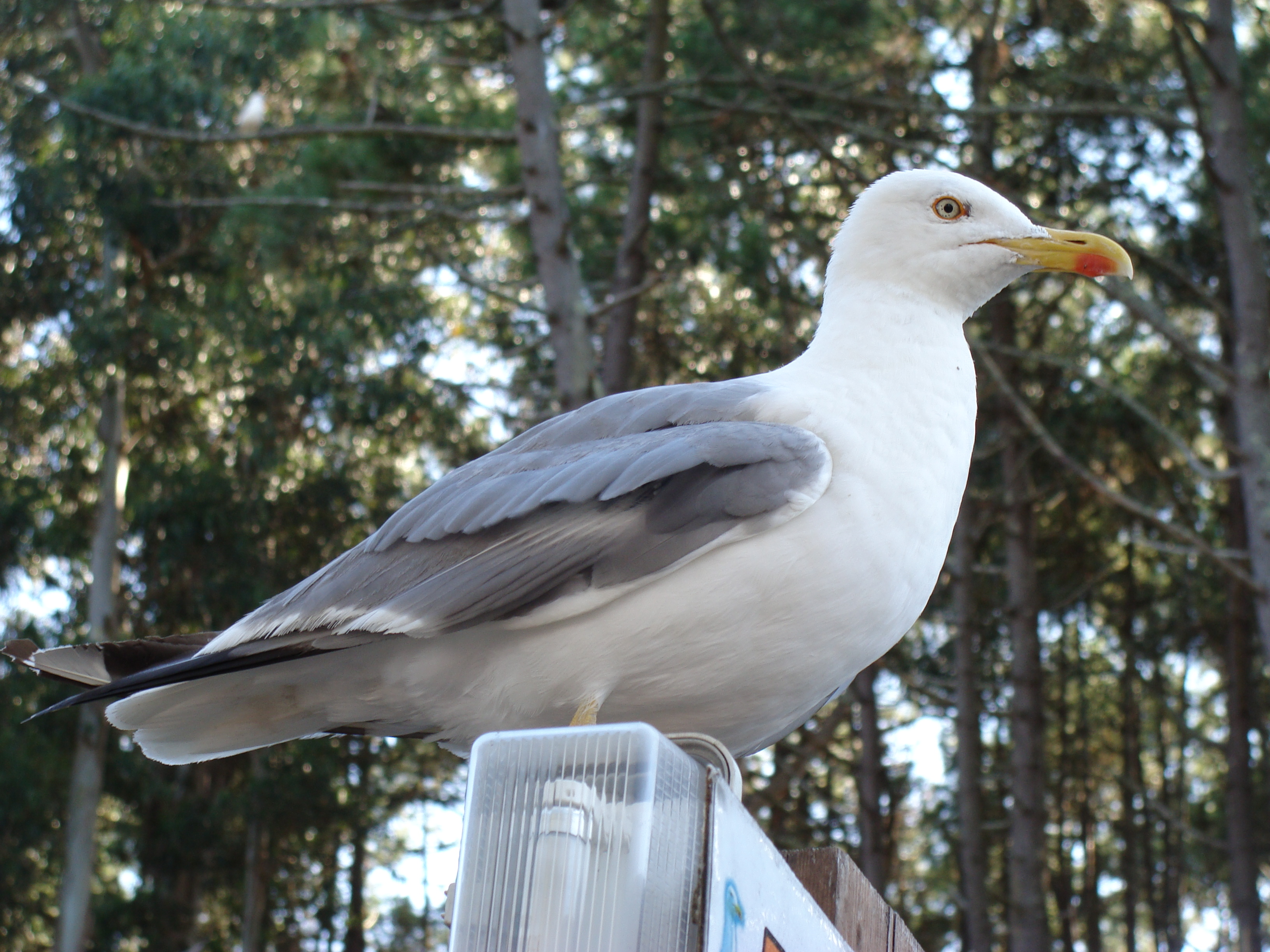
Yellow-legged gull (Larus michaellis), common in the past along the entire Galician coast

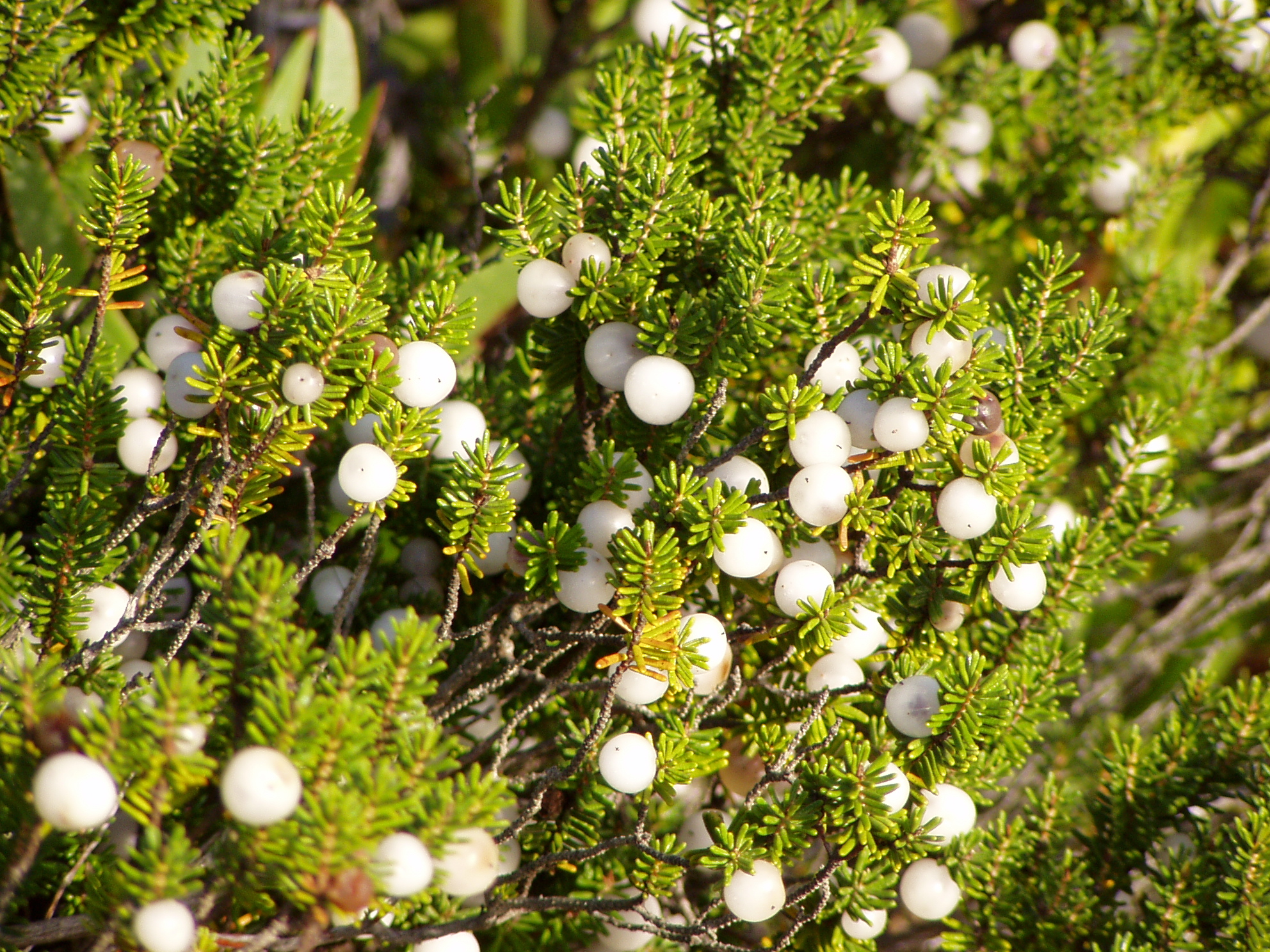
Cíes boasts the largest Galician population of Corema album

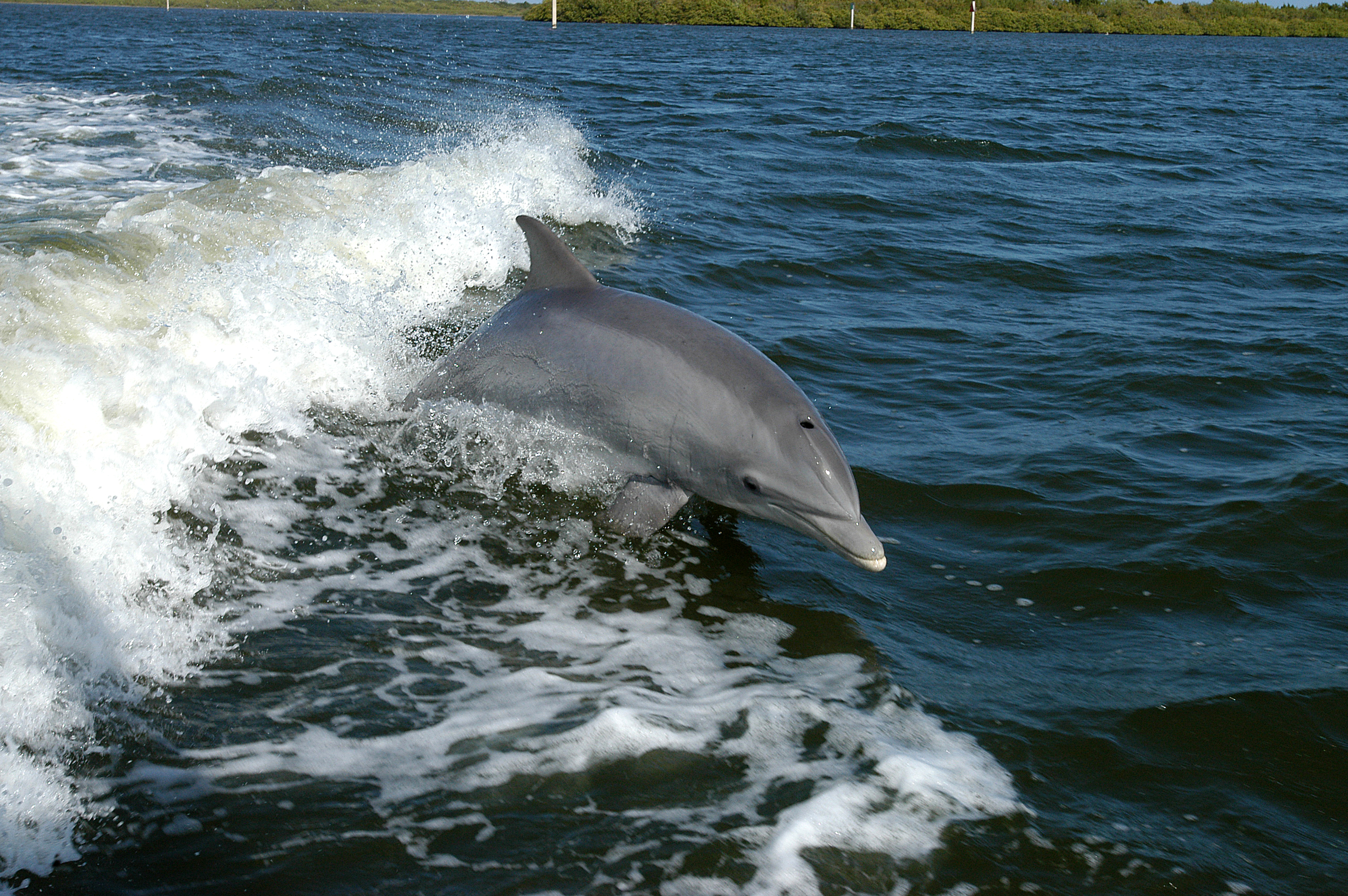
The common bottlenose dolphin is the most abundant marine mammal in the park

== History ==
There are traces of human occupation in the islands since the Iron Age. Ceramics have also been found since Roman times. The islands were occupied by various monastic orders during the Middle Ages, were owned by the Church, gauged by nobles of the time and attacked by invaders who used them as a base for raids on the coast. More recently, the Cíes Islands were inhabited until the eighteenth century, but by pirates' action, people had to abandon the islands. Ons Island is still home to a small permanent population of 63 people. In 1980 the Cíes Islands were declared a natural park. They are also a Special Protection Area for birds. On June 13, 2002 was declared a national park. However, 6 months later, the oil spill caused by the Prestige oil tanker came on its shores, except on the island of Cortegada. The islands of Lobeiras and Sisargas were initially discussed to be part of the national park and could be added to the park in the future.

== Tourism ==
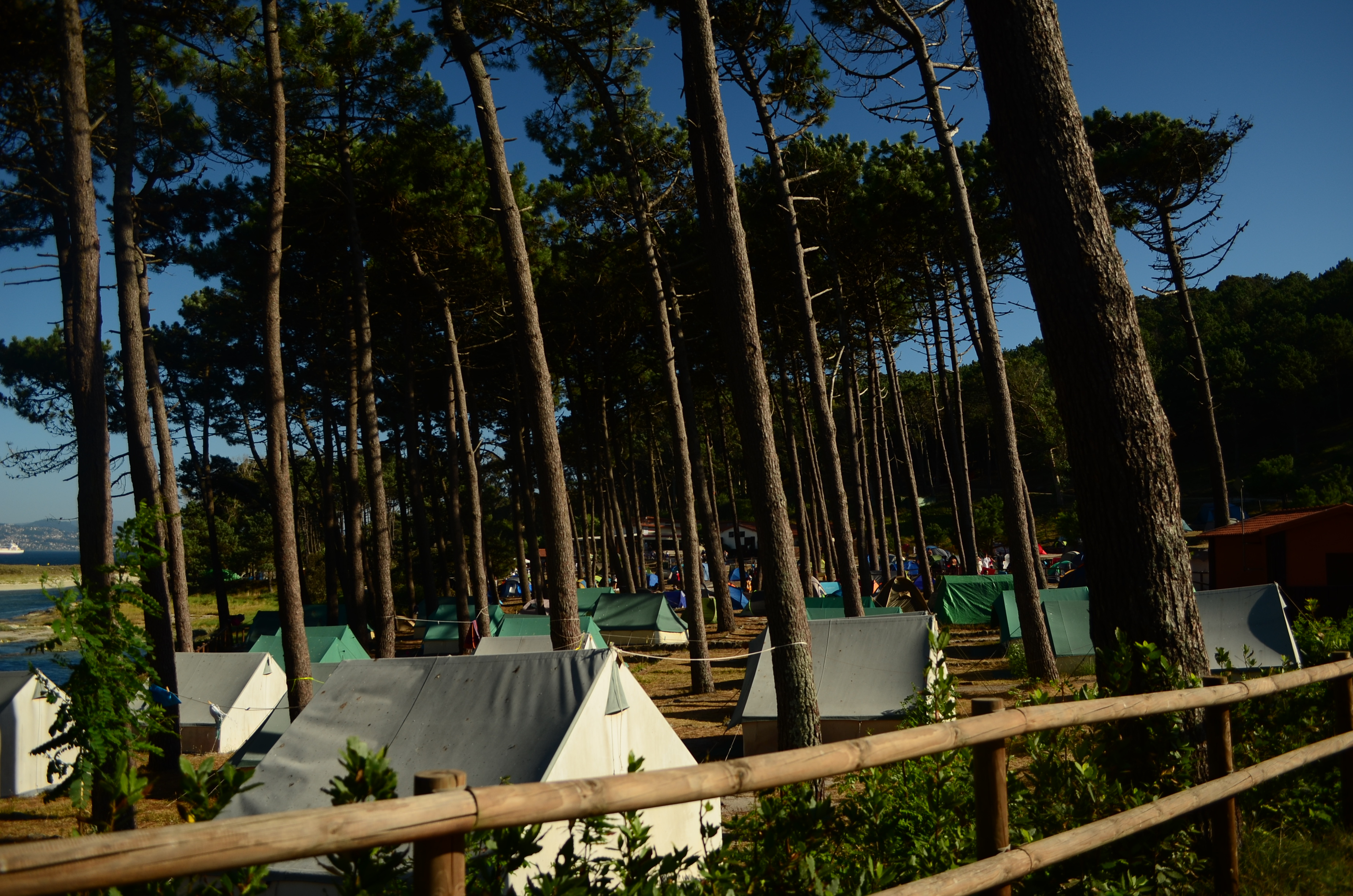
Camping area in Montefaro Island

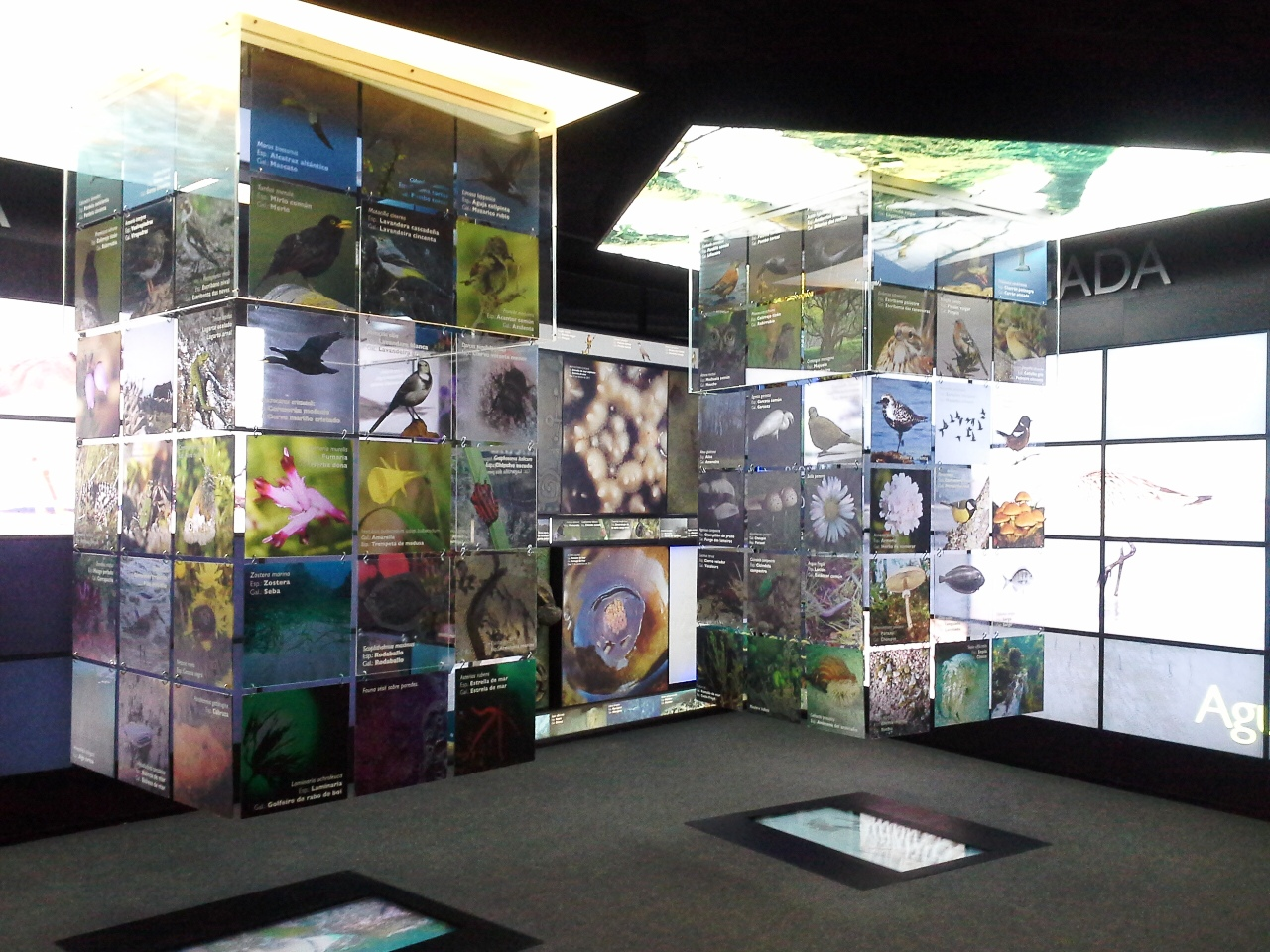
Visitor Center in Vigo

During the summer, daily boats link Cíes with the ports of Vigo, Baiona and Cangas, and Ons with Portonovo, Sanxenxo, Bueu, Marín and Pontevedra. Daily affluence is limited and all visitors are required to previously book an authorization request from the Galician Government. In Cíes there is a camping area but permissions have to be reserved at the Vigo port. Access to Salvora and Cortegada is more restricted, requiring organized visits. There are no waste bins on the islands. Visitors are required to take their litter back to the mainland.

In 2017, the number of visitors to the park totaled 327,149. The Cíes archipelago received by far the most tourists (216,975), followed by Ons (88,306), Sálvora (7,261) and Cortegada (6,500).

The park has two visitor centers, one in Vigo and one in Ons. Additionally, Cíes is equipped with an information center, and there are information points in Cíes, Ons and Cortegada.

== Environmental issues ==
Due to successive fires and agricultural practice, the original forests of the islands eventually declined and reforestation attempts in the 70s and 80s of the 20th century were performed with foreign species, particularly Eucalyptus and Acacias. While successful at creating new forests, this resulted in a diminishing quality of the soil and an increased risk of fire. The park is gradually replacing these species with arbutus, pine trees and birches, a process expected to take 20 years to completion.

The Prestige oil spill in 2002 and the subsequent cleanup caused major environmental damage in the park. Although almost all traces of fuel have disappeared, two decades later the park's biodiversity has not yet recovered pre-spill levels. The population of lichens was completely wiped out in several locations and has repopulated only partially, while the annual reproductive success of the European shag was reduced by more than half.

== Gallery ==
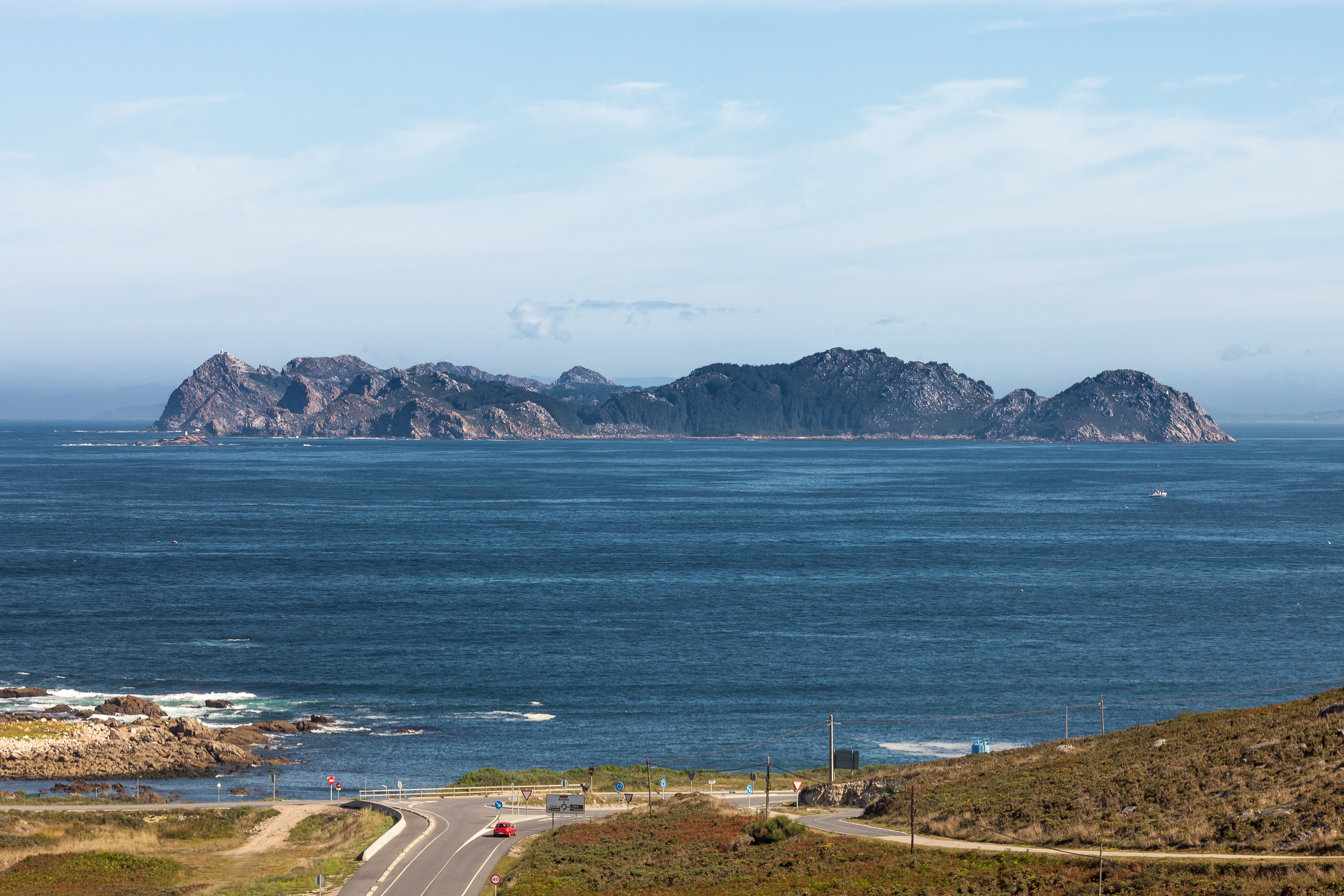
Cíes Islands from Cabo Silleiro

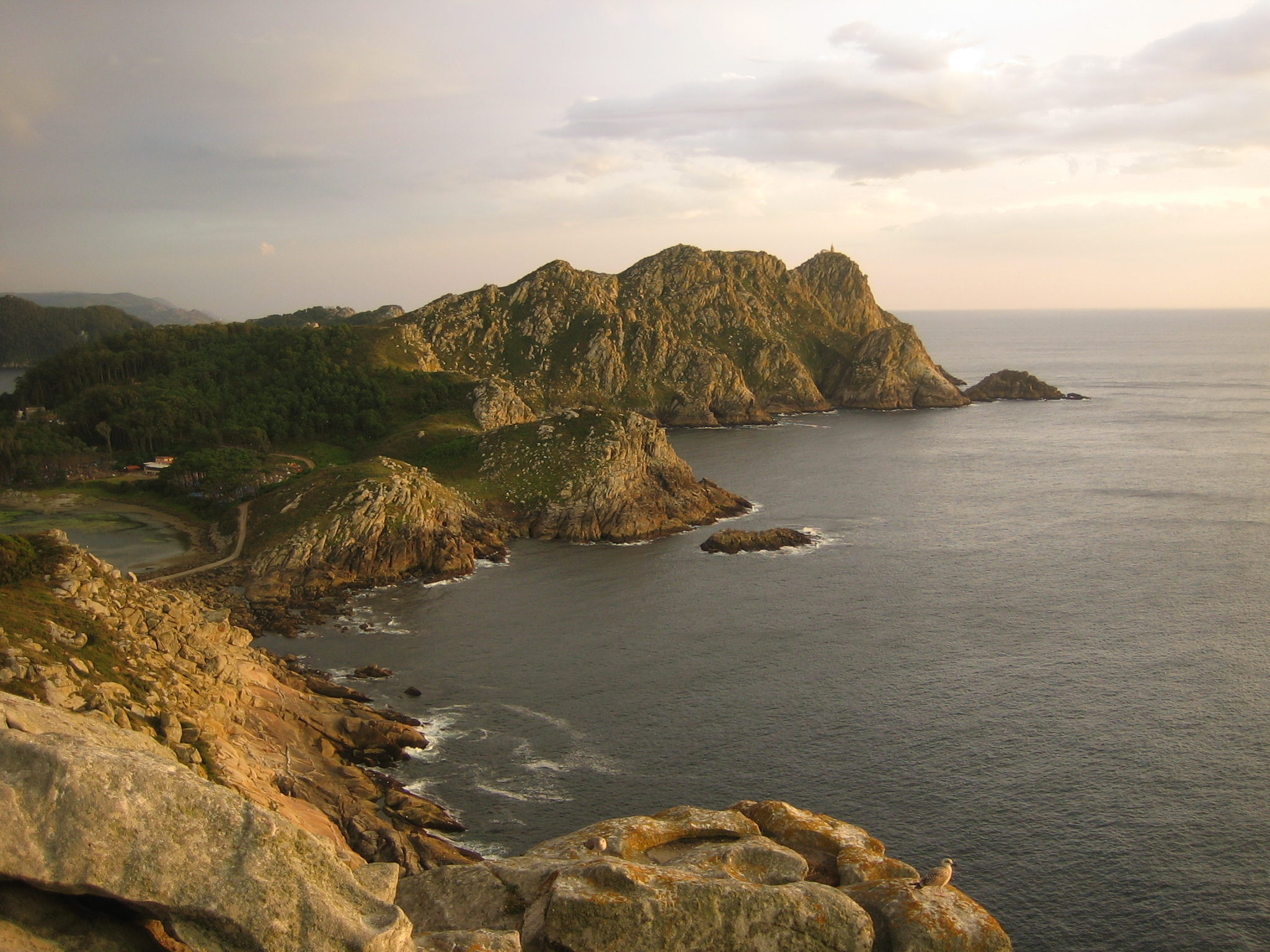
Cliffs on the Atlantic side of Cíes

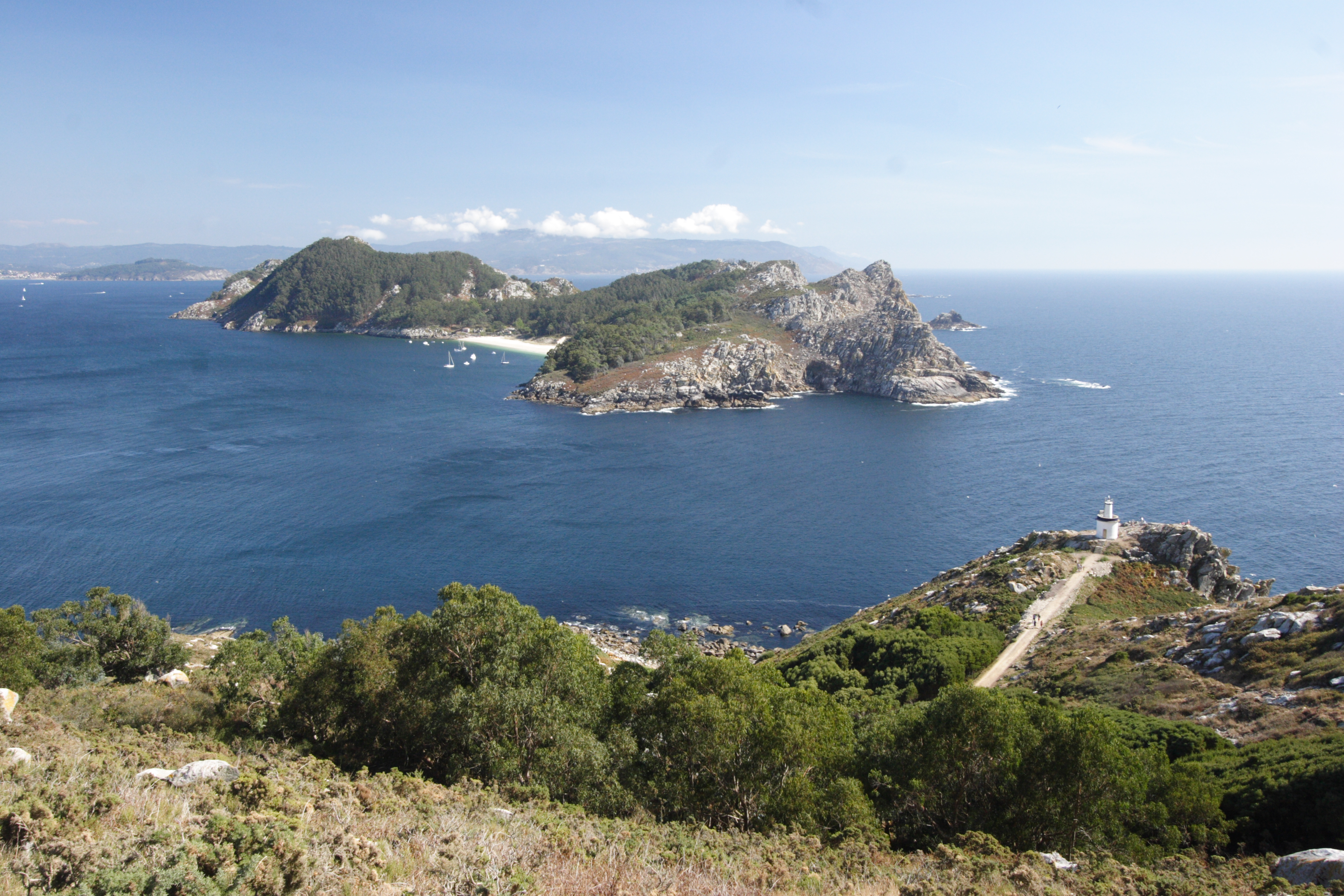
San Martiño Island in Cíes

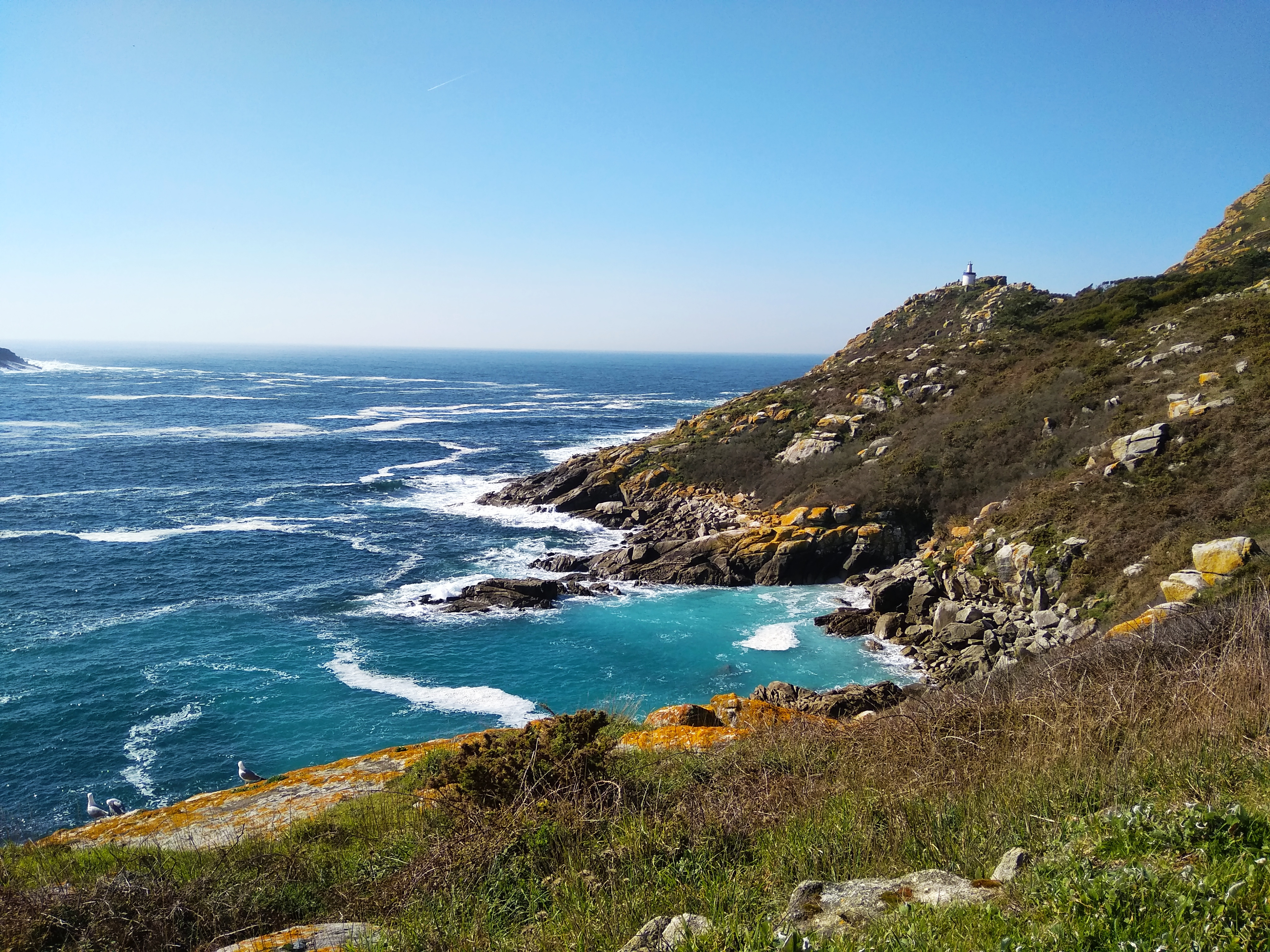
Porta lighthouse in Faro Island, Cíes

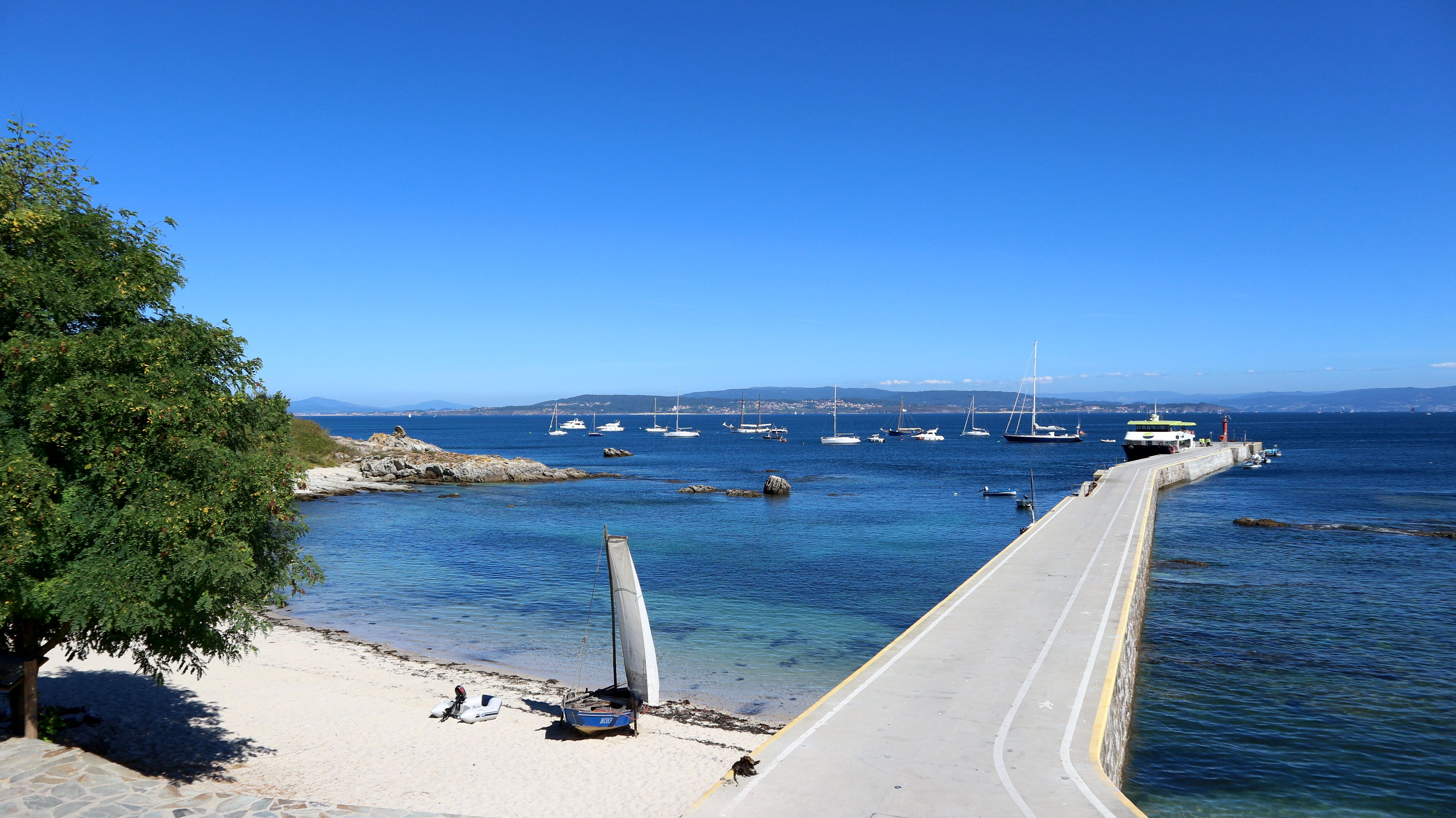
Dorna beach and port, Ons

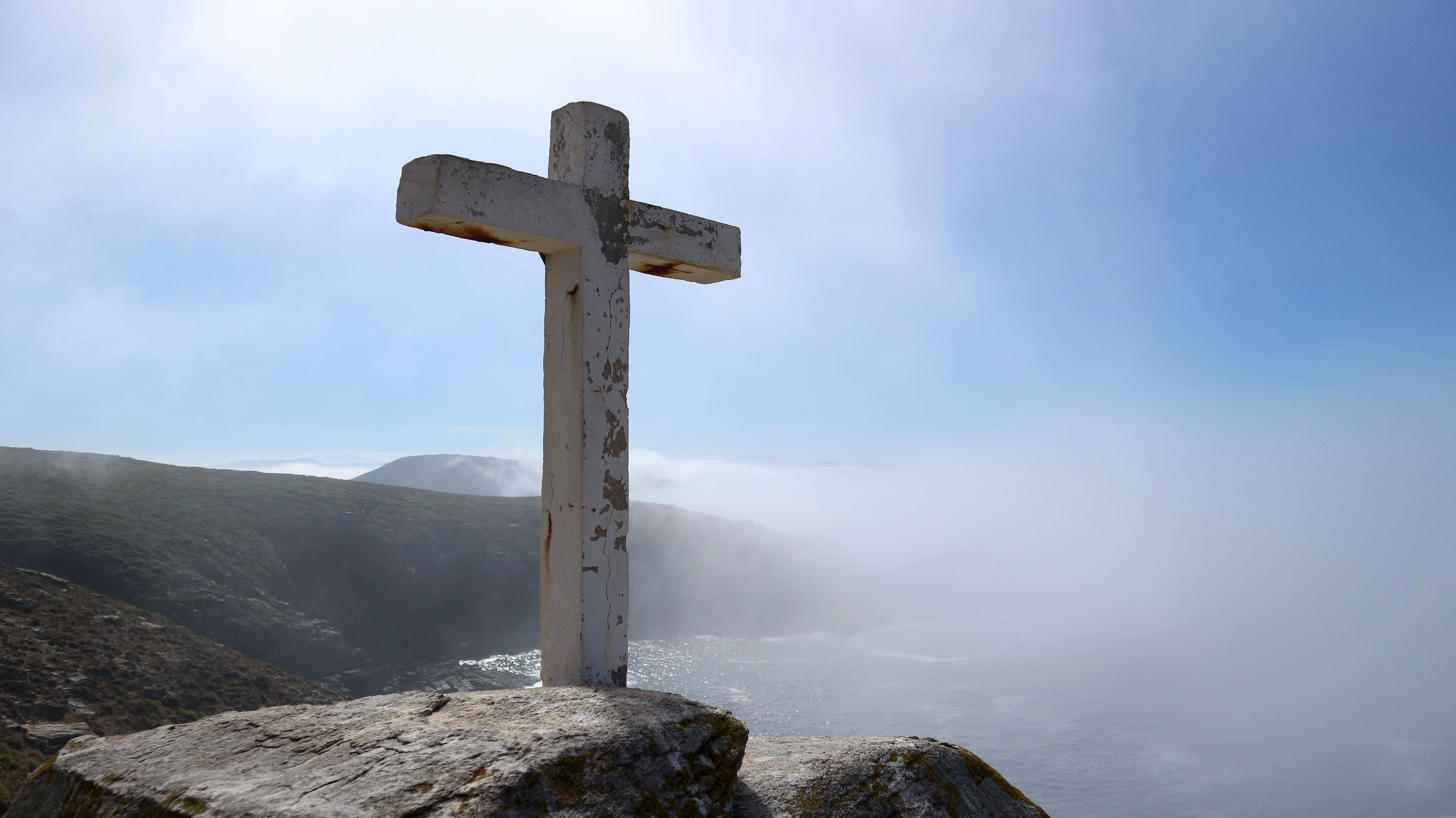
Cruceiro near Buraco do Inferno, Ons

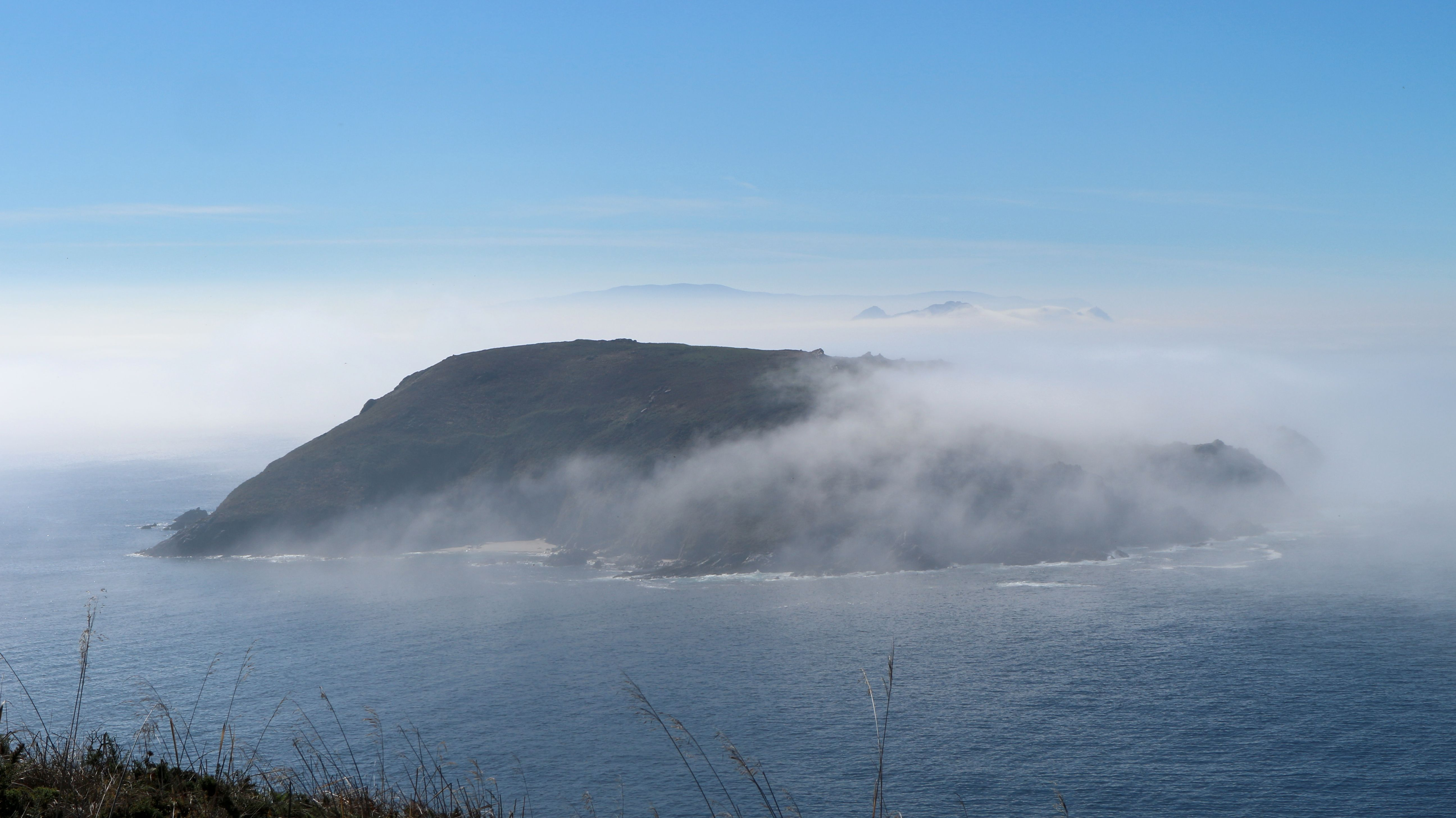
Onza Island

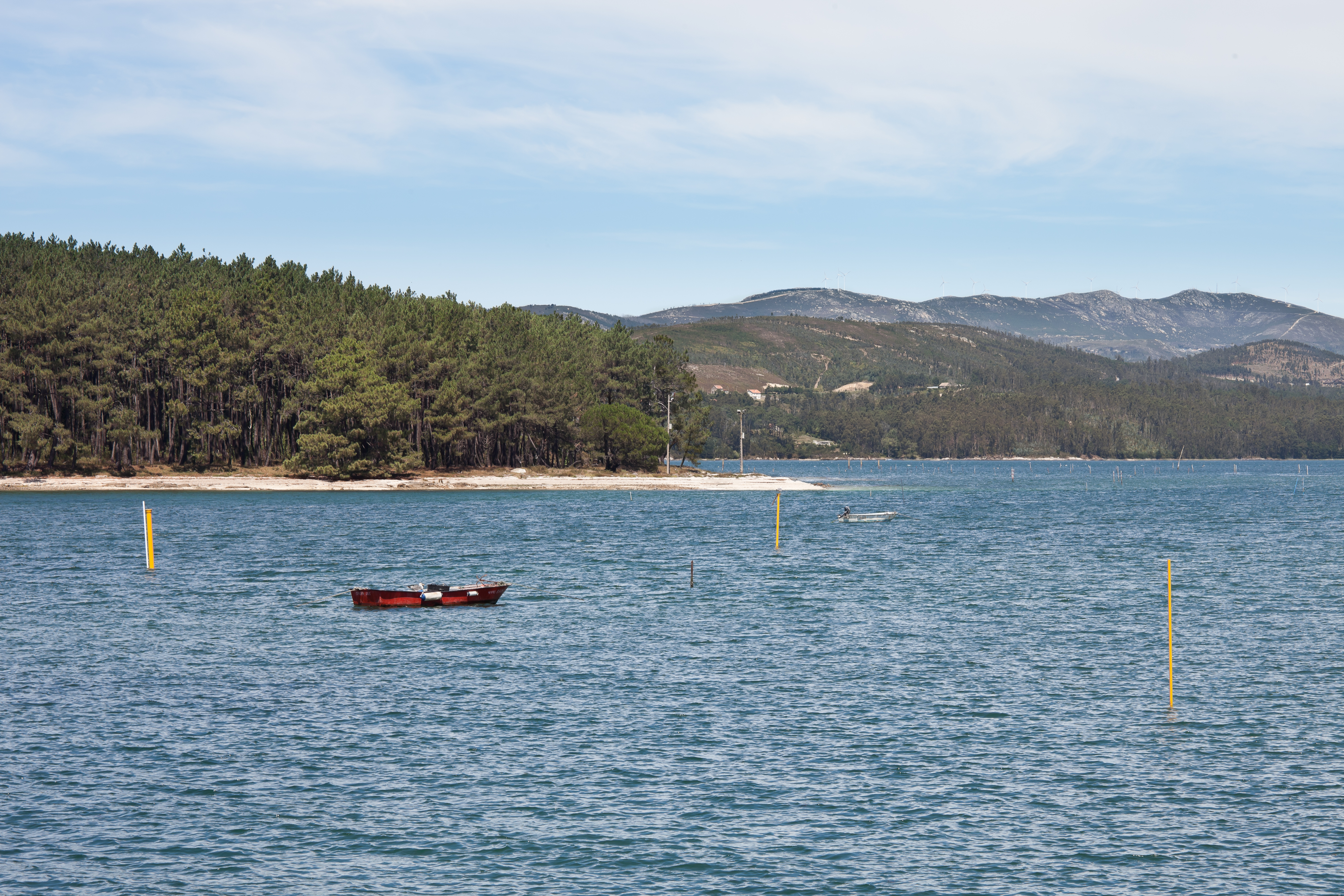
Cortegada Island from Vilagarcía de Arousa

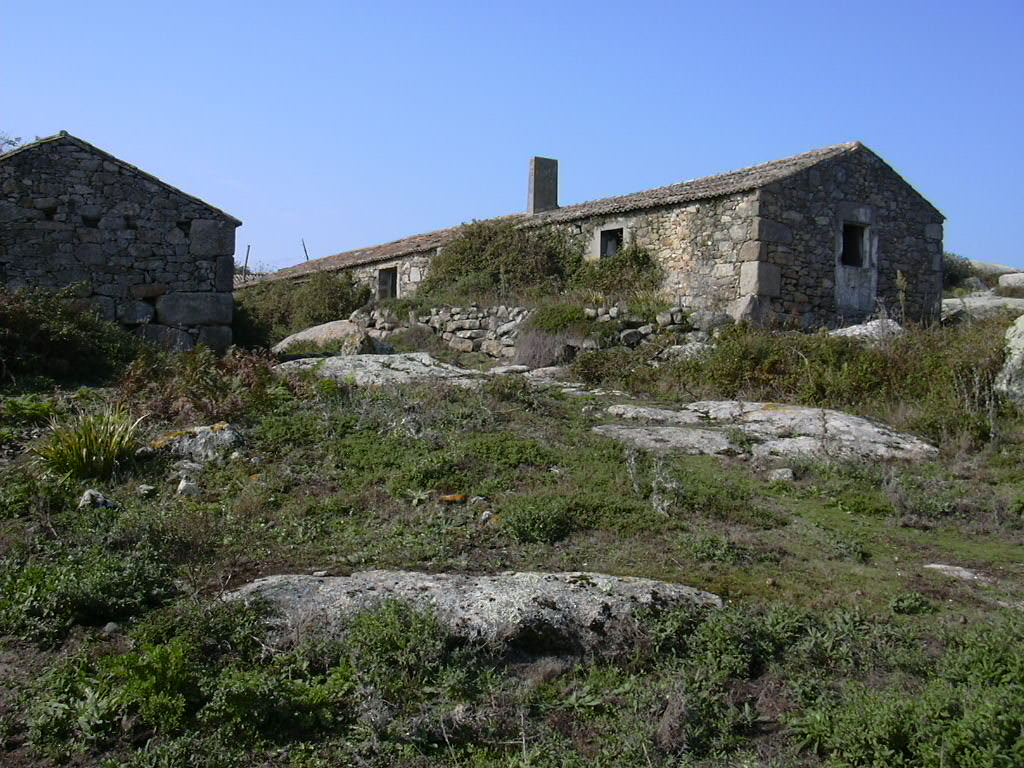
Ancient village in Sálvora
