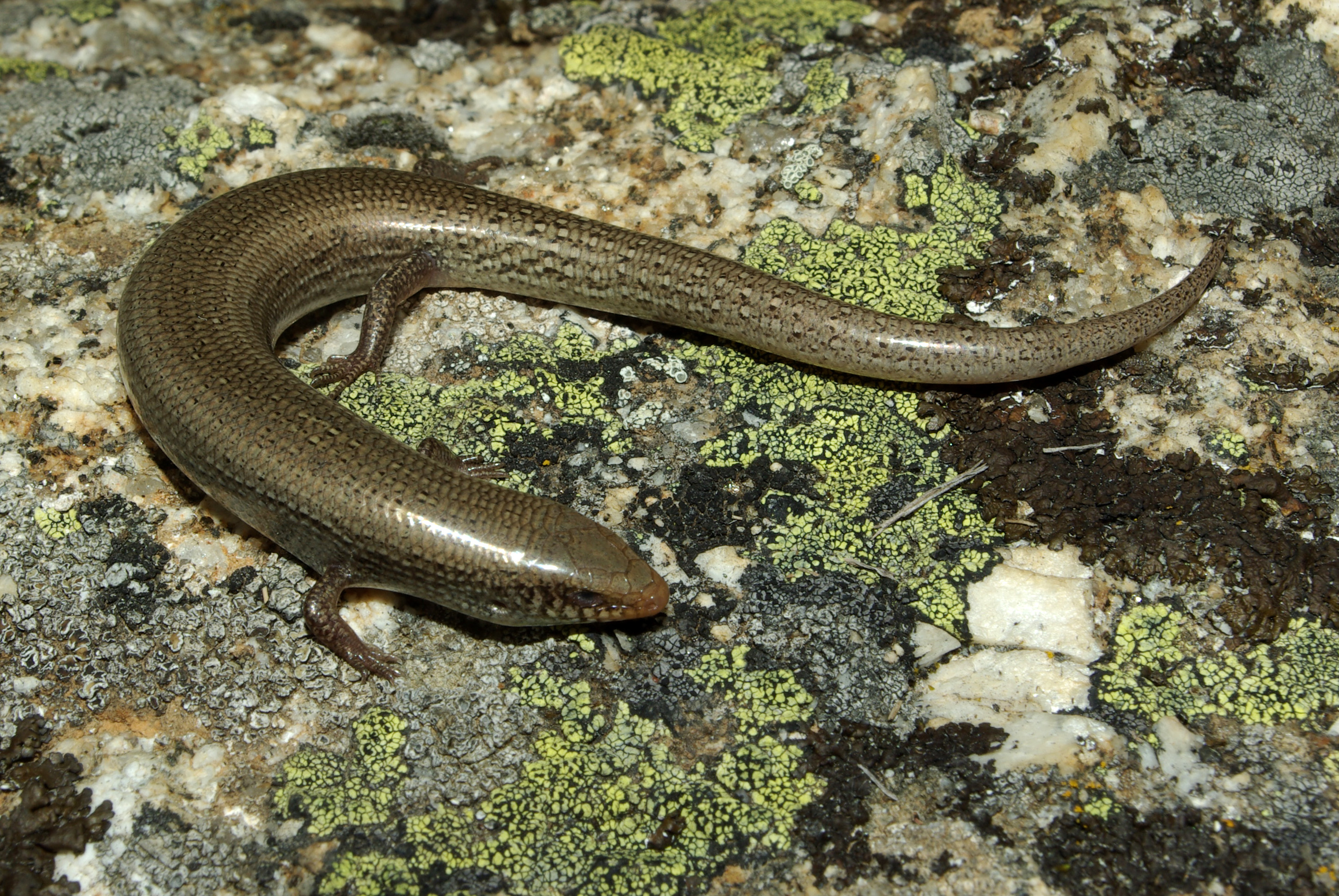

Conservation status
- Near Threatened (IUCN 3.1)

Scientific classification
- Kingdom: Animalia
- Phylum: Chordata
- Class: Reptilia
- Order: Squamata
- Family: Scincidae
- Genus: Chalcides
- Species: C. bedriagai

Binomial name
- Chalcides bedriagai (Boscá, 1880)

Synonyms
- Gongylus ocellatus bedriagai Boscá, 1880; Chalcides bedriagai albaredae Valverde, 1968; Chalcides bedriagai — Malkmus, 1982

= Chalcides bedriagai =

Species of lizard

Chalcides bedriagai, commonly known as Bedriaga's skink, is a species of lizard in the family Scincidae. The species is endemic to the Iberian Peninsula. It usually lives in sandy areas with sparse vegetation and good ground cover. It can also live in open woodland and burrow into loose soil. Females of the species give birth to live young. This skink is active during day and dusk, and it is very timid. It may reach about 16 cm (6.3 in) in total length (including tail), and it has five digits on each foot. It preys on insects, spiders, slugs, and woodlice.

== Etymology ==
Both the specific name, bedriagai, and the common name, Bedriaga's skink, are in honor of Russian herpetologist Jacques von Bedriaga.

== Description ==
Bedriaga's skink resembles a scaled-down version of the ocellated skink (Chalcides ocellatus). It has a small head, an elongated cylindrical body and short limbs with five digits on each foot. It measures up to 17 cm (7 in) in total length, at least half of which may be the fairly broad tail. Females are usually larger than males, and in both sexes the tail may sometimes be broken off or in the process of regeneration. There are 24 to 28 scales around the mid-body. The colour is pale brown, yellowish-brown, or grey, with numerous small black-edged eyespots and usually a paler lateral line running along either side. Juveniles are a darker colour.

== Geographic range and habitat ==
Bedriaga's skink is native to Spain and Portugal. It is largely absent from northern Spain and its distribution is rather patchy elsewhere. It also occurs on the Mediterranean islands of the Islas del Mar Menor and the Isla de Nueva Tabarca and the Atlantic islands of Cies Islands, Pessegueiro Island, Ons Island and Islote de Sancti Petri. Its typical habitat is sandy heathland with scrubby vegetation or sandy areas with more dense vegetation. It also occurs in open woodland, clearings, scrubland areas and rocky hillside slopes up to an altitude of about 1,750 metres (5,740 ft) above sea level. It can adapt to living in moderately degraded areas.

== Subspecies ==
There are three subspecies:

- Chalcides bedriagai bedriagai (Boscá, 1880)
- Chalcides bedriagai cobosi Valverde, 1966
- Chalcides bedriagai pistaciae Valverde, 1966

== Behaviour ==
Bedriaga's skink is a diurnal species and feeds on a wide range of small invertebrates. It has secretive habits and likes to bask in the sun in well-hidden locations. When disturbed it seeks cover in dense undergrowth or under ground, and it can burrow very quickly through loose soil. At breeding time, males become territorial and often fight. Females may mate with more than one male and are viviparous. The gestation period is about eleven weeks after which one to six young are born. The newly emerged juveniles are about 6 cm (2.4 in) long.

== Status ==
Major threats to this species, C. bedriagai, include modification of its habitat by increased afforestation or coastal development, and increases in the population of the wild boar (Sus scrofa) may have an impact. The population of this skink is believed to be in decline, especially in some island populations, and the IUCN has listed it as being "Near Threatened".
