= Ons Island =

Island in Pontevedra province, Spain

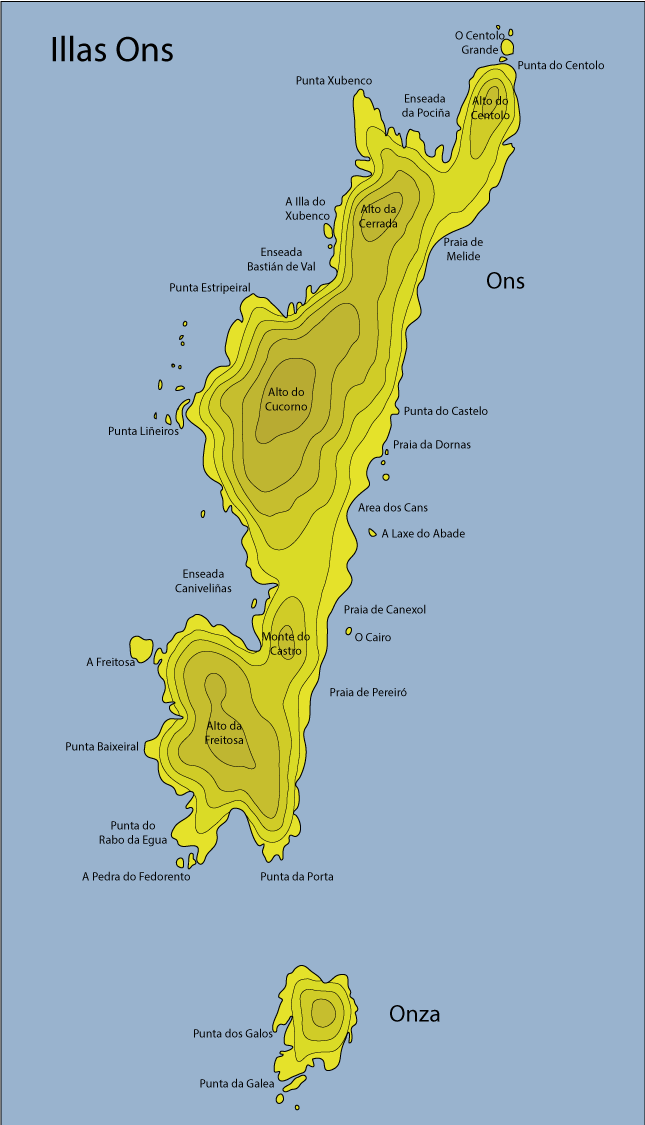
- Map of Ons Island and archipelago

- Location within Spain

Geography
- Location: Atlantic Ocean
- Coordinates: 42.381°N 8.933°W
- Area: 4.458 km^{2} (1.721 sq mi)
- Length: 6 km (3.7 mi)
- Width: 1.5 km (0.93 mi)
- Highest elevation: 128 m (420 ft)

Administration
- Spain
- Autonomous community: Galicia
- Province: Pontevedra
- Municipality: Bueu

Demographics
- Population: 81 hab. (2013)

The Ons Island (Galician: Illa de Ons; Spanish: Isla de Ons) is the main island of a small archipelago in the Ria de Pontevedra in Galicia, Spain. Ons belongs administratively to the municipality of Bueu, which has a regular ferry boat connection to the island, as have the mainland towns of Portonovo, Sanxenxo, Marín and Aldán.

== Toponymy ==
The place name ‘Ons’ may derive from the ancient name ‘Aunios’, which Pliny the Elder used to refer to a group of islands off the north-western coast of Hispania. The name subsequently appears documented as ‘Aones’ in the year 899, in a deed of donation transferring the island to the chapter of Santiago de Compostela. Its ultimate etymological origin has not been established with certainty.

== History ==
=== Prehistory and ancient period ===
The earliest evidence of human presence on Ons dates back to prehistoric times, although the archaeological remains discovered to date do not provide sufficient evidence to establish the continuity or extent of human occupation on the island. In contrast, remains and settlements dating from the Bronze Age and belonging to the Castro culture were discovered.

The Roman presence is evidenced by the remains of two salting facilities located on Canexol beach, dating from the 1st century AD. These finds indicate that the island was involved in the maritime economic activities of the Galician coast during antiquity.

=== Middle Ages ===
The first known documentary reference to Ons dates from the year 899, when King Alfonso III donated the island to the chapter of Santiago de Compostela. The donation was subsequently confirmed by other monarchs, including Alfonso VI in 1109.

There are records dating back to the 15th century of a monastery on the island, which may have been used as a place of retreat by monks from monastic communities on the mainland. The anthropomorphic tomb carved into the rock, known as Laxe do Crego and situated on a small islet off the beach at Area dos Cans, may date from this period.

=== Modern period ===
In the 16th century, the island passed into the hands of the Montenegro family, to whom the Church granted feudal control. Documents from this period confirm that Ons was inhabited and had a parish church.

However, from the late 16th century and throughout the 17th and 18th centuries, the island suffered raids by English privateers and Turkish and Barbary pirates. Among the English attackers, Francis Drake stood out, whose expeditions affected various settlements along the Galician coast. The looting and insecurity led to the gradual abandonment of the island by its inhabitants, who sought refuge in the coastal towns. During the 18th century, Ons became virtually uninhabited, although it continued to be used for activities exploiting its natural resources and livestock.

In the early 19th century, during the Peninsular War, two small fortifications were built on the island to protect the entrance to the Pontevedra estuary. The improved security situation encouraged settlers to return. A system was established for the cultivation of the land, whereby plots were allocated to settlers, who were required to pay a fee for their use. Between 1835 and 1840, a fish-curing factory was built next to the quay. This industry boosted the island’s economy and contributed to population growth. Fishing gradually became an increasingly important economic activity, complementing agriculture and livestock farming.

In 1940, during Franco’s dictatorship, the government expropriated the island on the grounds of national defence. The 1950s marked the period of greatest demographic prosperity for Ons, when the population reached nearly 500. From the 1960s onwards, the population began to decline gradually. However, the exodus coincided with the development of coastal tourism during the 1970s and 1980s. Some houses were converted into hotels, shifting the island’s economy towards tourism. In 1982, the island came under the jurisdiction of the Regional Government of Galicia.

== Description ==
Several routes lead to the lighthouse, or to the Buraco do Inferno. The island has the only sustainable campsite in Galicia, with camping, cabin rental and glamping services.

Melide beach is located in the north of the island. It was one of the first nudist beaches in Galicia and can be reached by a two-kilometre path from the island's town centre.

== Conservation ==
In 2001 the European Union designated Ons a Special Protection Area for bird-life.

On 1 July 2002, it was incorporated into the Atlantic Islands of Galicia National Park, along with the archipelagos of Cíes, Sálvora and Cortegada.

== Sights ==
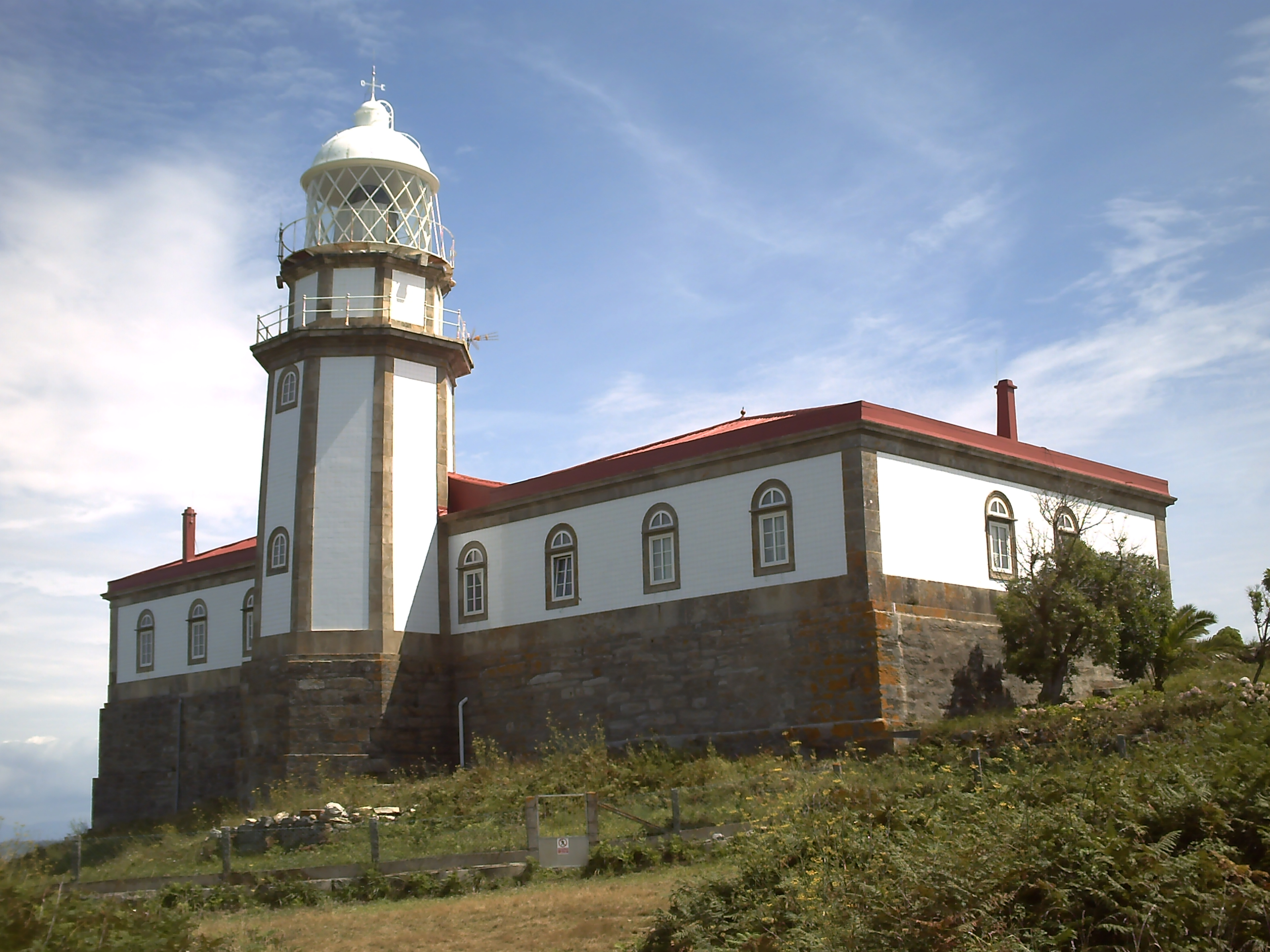
Lighthouse, built originally in the 1860s and reconstructed in 1926

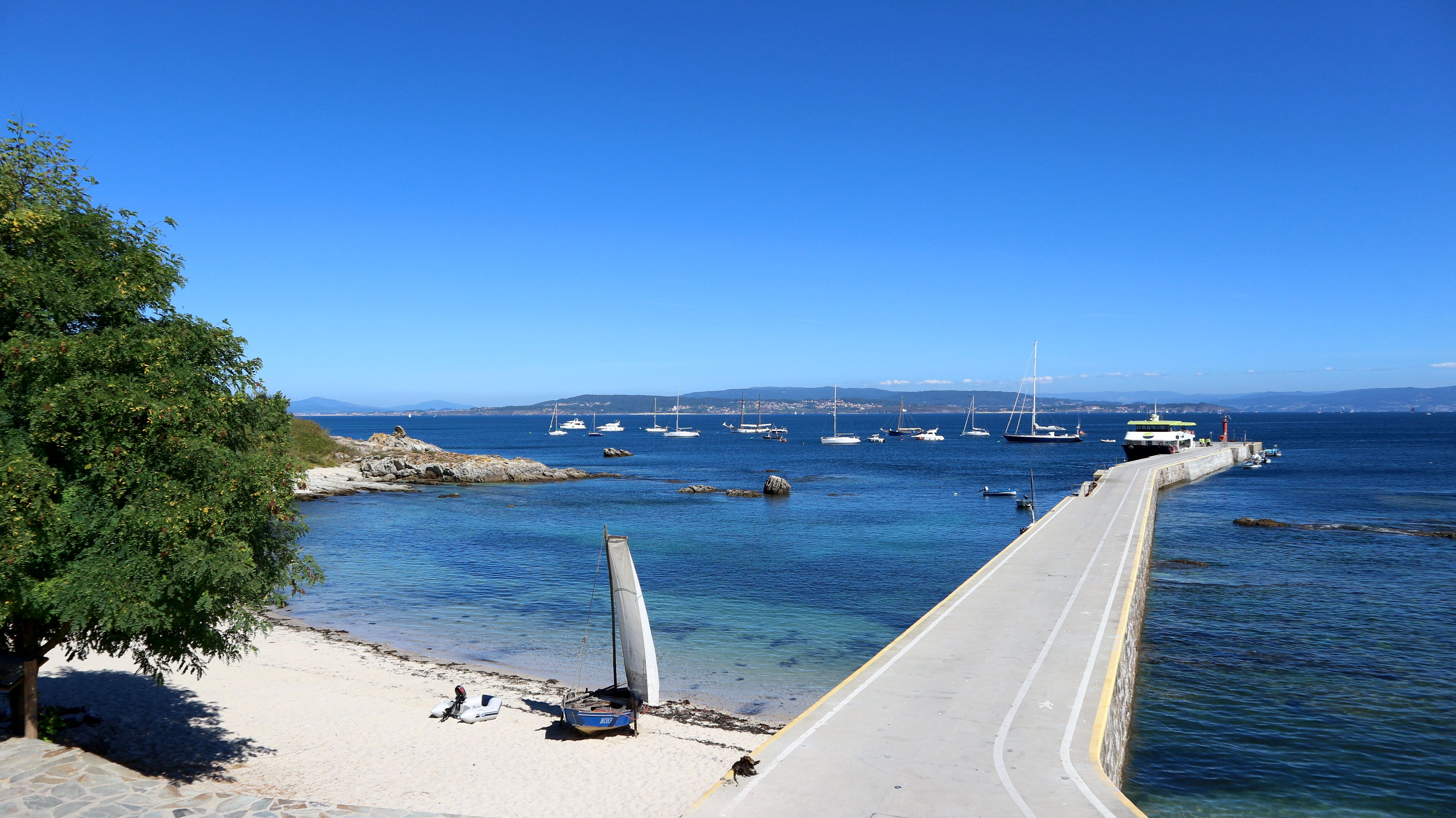
O Curro pier

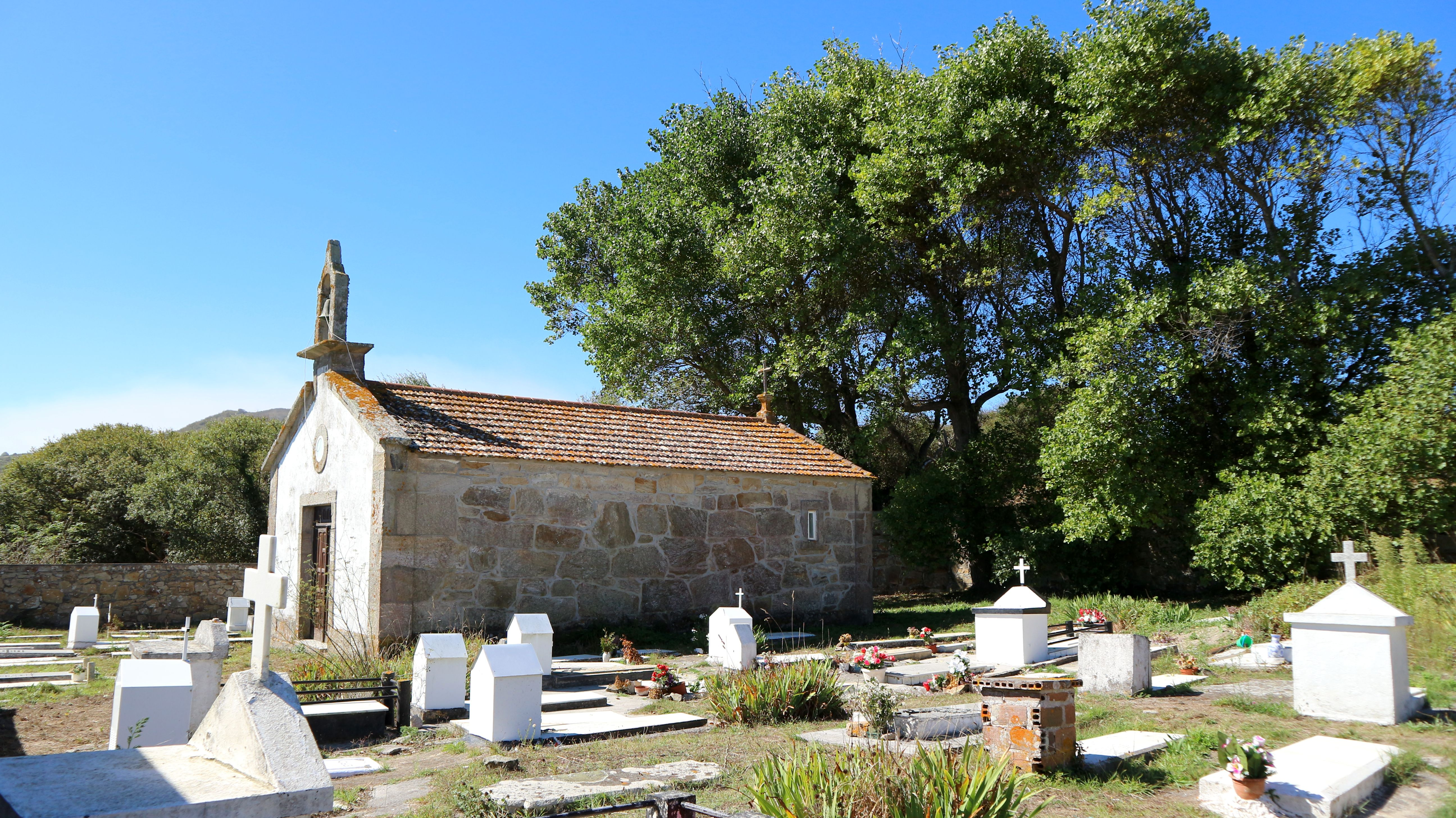
Chapel of San Xoaquín and graveyard

New church of San Xoaquín, built in the 1960s

An hórreo, traditional elevated granary found all over northwestern Iberian peninsula

== Related articles ==
- Ria de Pontevedra
