= Sálvora =

Island in Galicia, Spain

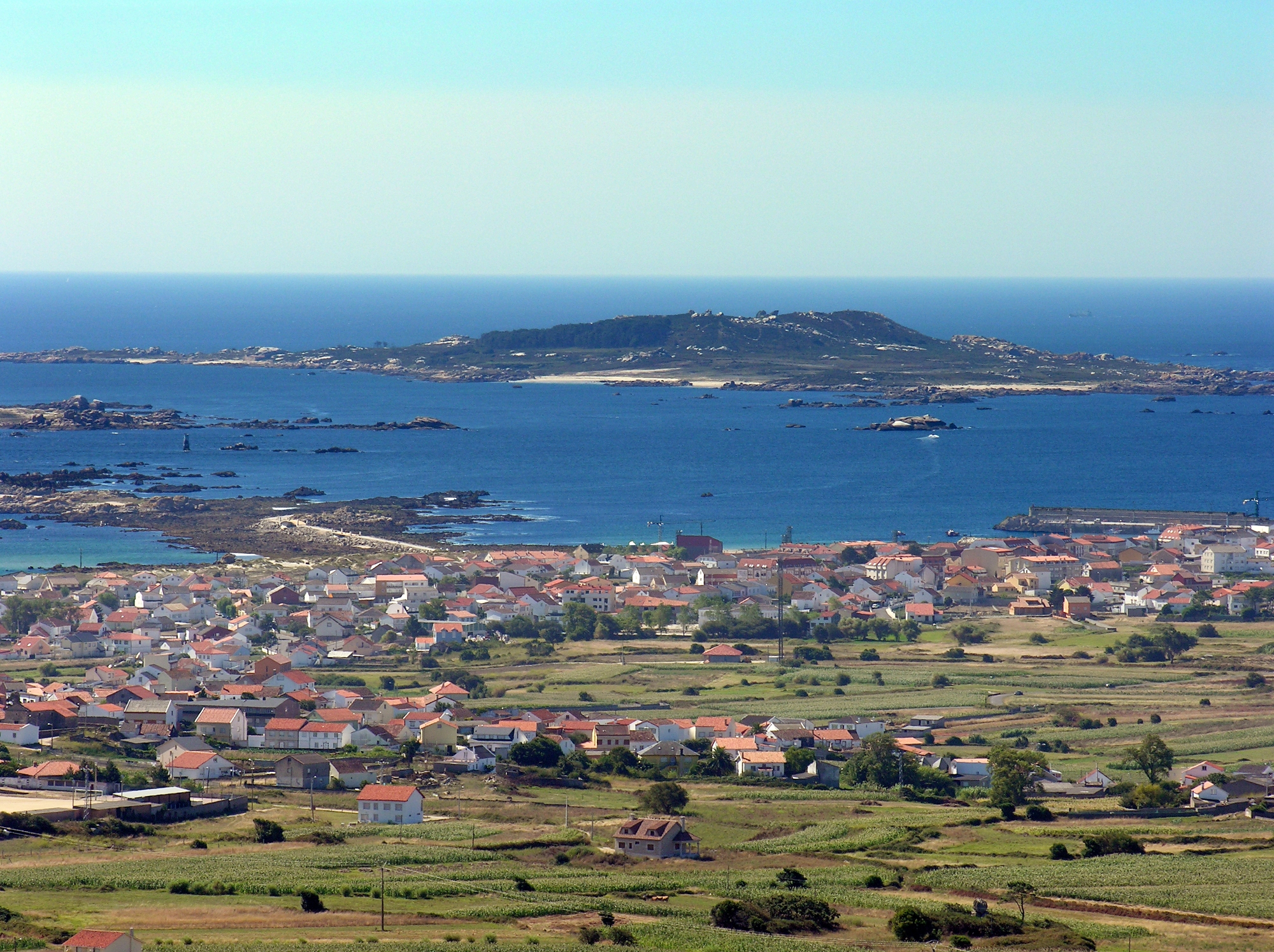
- Sálvora Island as seen from the mainland

- Location within Galicia

Geography
- Coordinates: 42.4736°N 9.0117°W
- Total islands: 1

Administration
- Spain
- Autonomous community: Galicia
- Province: A Coruña
- Municipality: Santa Uxía de Ribeira

Sálvora Island (Galician: Illa de Sálvora [ˈiɟɐ ðɪ ˈsalβʊɾɐ]; Spanish: Isla de Sálvora [ˈisla ðe ˈsalβoɾa]) is a small island located on the Ría de Arousa, coast of Galicia, Spain. It belongs to the municipality of Santa Uxía de Ribeira and is integrated into the Atlantic Islands of Galicia National Park. It is separated from the mainland by a distance of about 3 kilometers to the north. It occupies about 190 hectares and has a maximum height of 71 meters (As Gralleiras). Almost the entire perimeter of the island is rocky but has three beaches of fine white sand. Since 2001 it has been integrated into the Atlantic Islands of Galicia National Park.

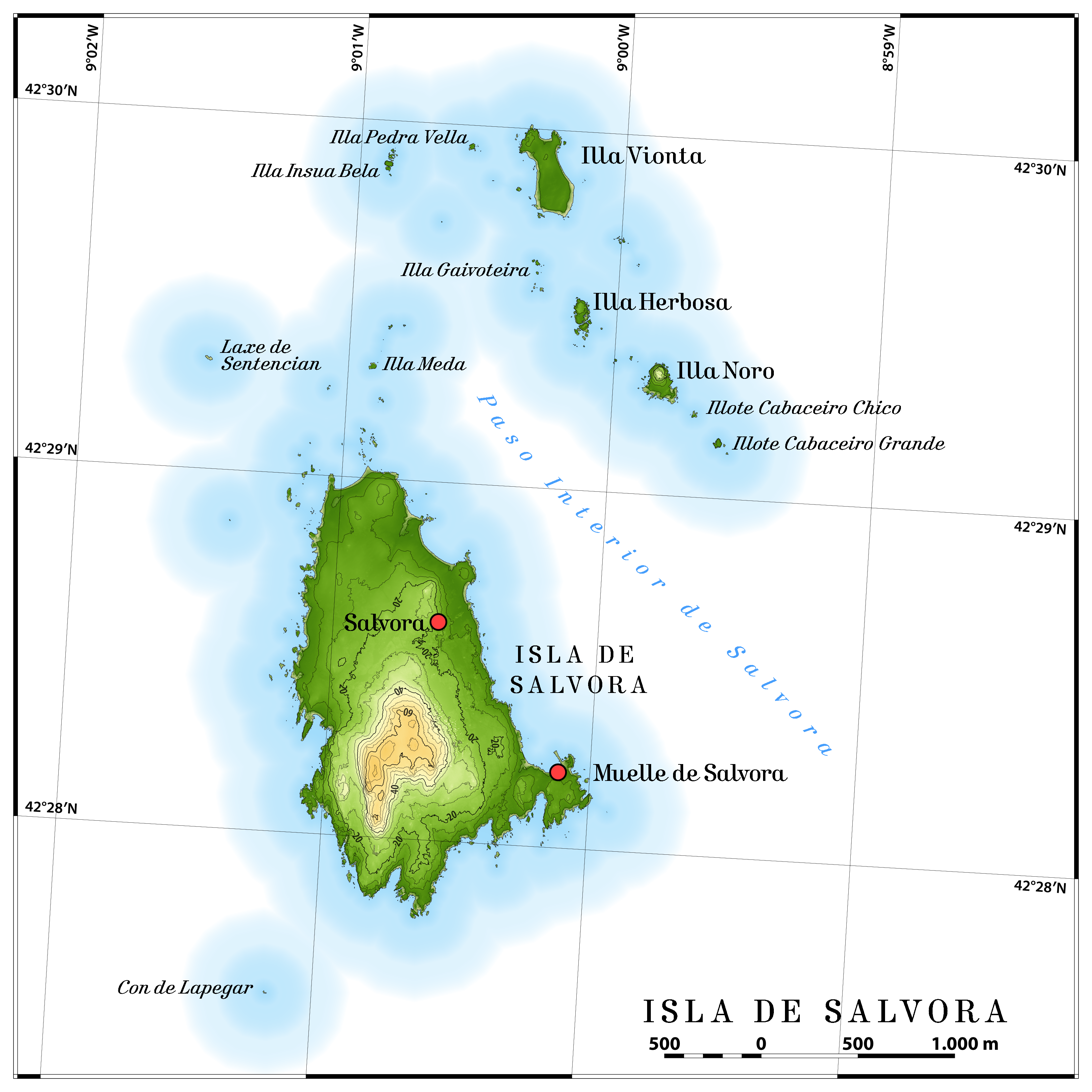
Map of Sálvora

Today, the island of Sálvora forms part of the civil parish of Aguiño (Riveira municipality). Previously the island depended on the civil parish of Carreira, which was for centuries the richest and most populous parish in the comarca, also the oldest.

In March 2007 the island was acquired by Caixa Galicia for 8.5 million euros. Later that same year the Ministry of Environment exercised its right of refusal, buying Sálvora, Vionta and Noro for the same amount. The Board of Galicia, which is the owner of the island since July 1, 2008, in conjunction with the Ministry of Environment, have started work to rehabilitate the enclave.

== History ==
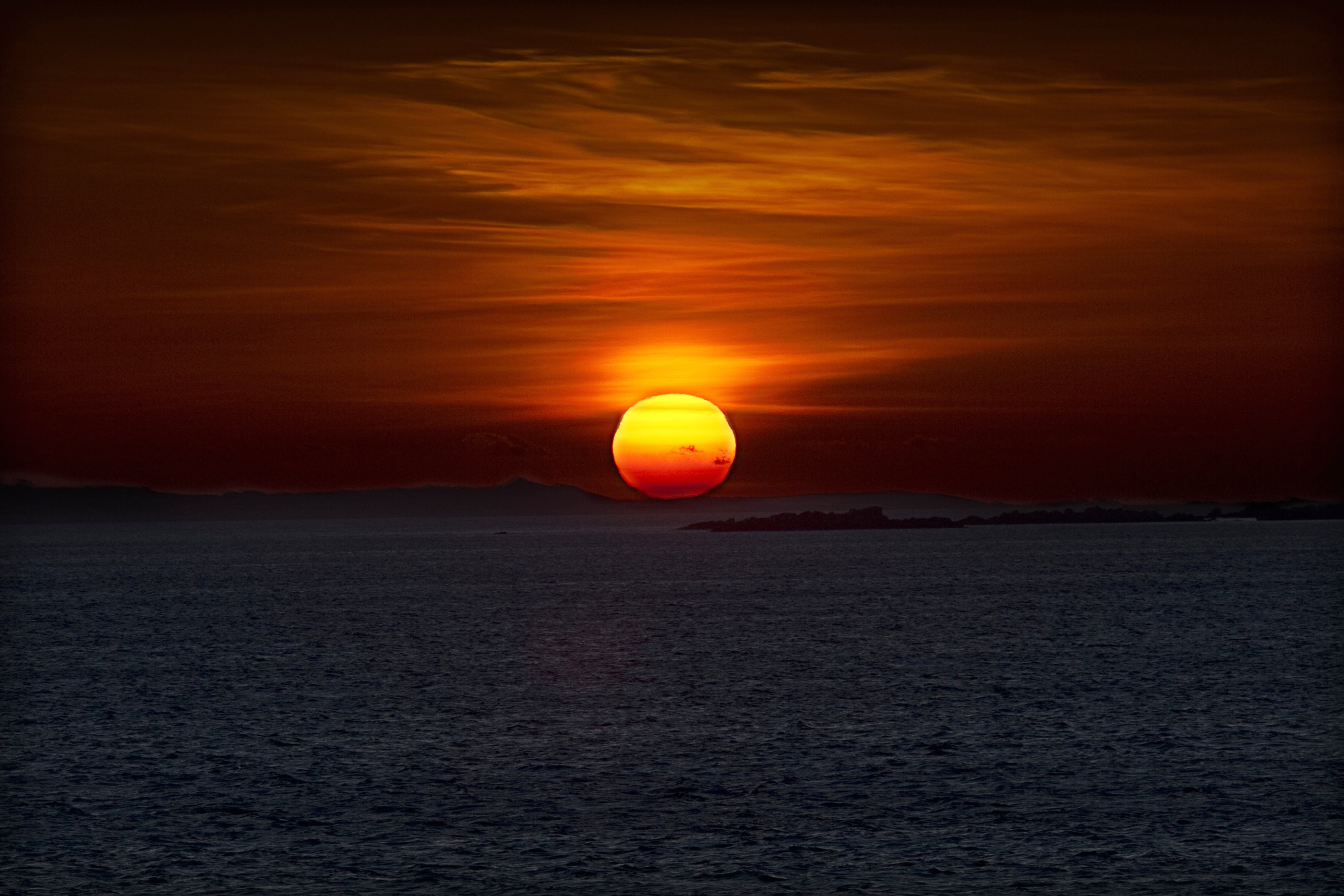
Sunset above the island of Sálvora

In the year 899, King Alfonso III donated the island to the Cathedral Chapter of Santiago, which claimed it in order to obtain resources for their livelihoods. This grant, which included Ons, Tambo, Arosa, Cies and Framio, was confirmed by Ordoño to Bishop Sisnando. In 1120 the island had already been invaded by Saracen ships who took refuge in the island waiting for reinforcements as they prepared to invade the land. The delay of that helped make the Christian ships sent by order of the archbishop of Santiago seized by the invading ships that stopped for long periods. Thereafter, this unknown island began to be coveted by the nobility of the time.
