= CIE =

CIE may refer to:

== Organizations ==
- Cambridge International Examinations, an international examination board
- Center for International Education at the University of Massachusetts-Amherst
- Cleveland Institute of Electronics, a private technical and engineering educational institution
- International Commission on Illumination (French: Commission internationale de l'éclairage)
- Computability in Europe, an international organization of computability theorists, computer scientists, mathematicians
- CIÉ (Córas Iompair Éireann), the Irish state transport authority
- Council on Islamic Education
- Transportes Aéreos Cielos Andinos, ICAO code: CIE
- Civil Information and Education Section (CIE), General Headquarters, the Supreme Commander for the Allied Powers in Japan (1945–1952)

== Science and technology ==
- CIE 1931 color space, one of the first mathematically defined color spaces, created by the International Commission on Illumination (CIE) in 1931
- Clasificación Internacional de Enfermedades, Spanish for International Classification of Diseases
- Commercial Information Exchange, a real estate database for commercial properties, similar to a residential Multiple Listing Service (MLS)
- Computer Interrupt Equipment, a form of discrete interrupt controller in Ferranti computers
- Congenital ichthyosiform erythroderma, a skin disease
- Control and Indicating Equipment
- Carbon Isotope Excursion, a rapid release of carbon to the ocean or atmosphere.

== Other uses ==
- Companion of the Order of the Indian Empire (C.I.E.)
- Corpus Inscriptionum Etruscarum, the known body of Etruscan inscriptions
- C^{ie}, the abbreviation for the French compagnie ("company")
- Italian electronic identity card (carta di identità elettronica)

== See also ==
- LaCie (la compagnie, 'the company'), a computer equipment company
- CIES (disambiguation)
