= CIES =

CIES or Cies may refer to:

== Groups, organizations ==
- Council for International Exchange of Scholars, International Institute of Education; which assists the U.S. government in managing the Fulbright Program
- Comparative and International Education Society, a US-UK research organization
- Citizens' Institute for Environmental Studies, Korea Federation for Environmental Movements
- International Centre for Sports Studies (CIES; French: Centre International d'Etude du Sport), University of Neuchatel, Neuchatel, Switzerland; a research centre formed in conjunction with FIFA (world soccer association)
  - CIES Football Observatory (for soccer) at the International Centre for Sports Studies
- International Center for a Scientific Ecology (ICSE; CIES; French: Centre International pour une Écologie Scientifique); see Heidelberg Appeal
- International Centre for Students and Interns (CIES; French: Centre International des Etudiants et Stagiaires), Campus France, Paris, France
- Centre d'initiation à l'enseignement supérieur (French: Higher Education Teaching Initiation Centre)
- Centro de Investigação e Estudos de Sociologia (Portuguese: Center for Research and Studies in Sociology), ISCTE – University Institute of Lisbon, Lisbon, Portugal
- Centro de Investigaciones y Estudios de la Salud (Spanish: Center for Health Research and Studies), National Autonomous University of Nicaragua; see Regional Center for Disaster Information for Latin America and the Caribbean
- CII Centre of Excellence in Innovation, Entrepreneurship and Startups (CIES), Confederation of Indian Industry
- Centre for International Environmental Studies, Geneva Graduate Institute, International Geneva, Genva, Switzerland; see List of environmental research institutes
- Center for Intensive English Studies, Florida State University, Tallahassee, Florida; see List of Florida State University people
- Central Intelligence Evaluation Sector, Department of National Intelligence and Security (South Africa), African National Congress
- Canada India Education Society, which annually awards The Dhahan Prize

== Military ==
- Battle of Cíes Islands (1590), a naval battle in Spanish waters
- Cíes-class patrol boat; see List of retired Spanish Navy ships
- Spanish boat Cíes; see List of retired Spanish Navy ships

== Other uses ==
- Cíes Islands, Vigo, Pontevedra, Spain; an archipelago in the Atlantic Ocean
- Companion of the Institution of Engineers in Scotland (CIES), postnominal letters and position at the Institution of Engineers in Scotland
- Capital Investment Entrant Scheme, seen in Visa policy of Hong Kong#Employment, investment, and study visas

== See also ==
- CIE (disambiguation) for the singular of CIEs and Cies
