= Ahmed Rashad Abdel-khalik =

American scholar

Ahmed Rashad Abdel-Khalik
- Born: Egypt
- Citizenship: American
- Occupations: Accountant, academic and researcher
- Title: V. K. Zimmerman Professor of International Accounting and Professor of Accountancy
- Awards: Competitive Manuscript Contest Awards, American Accounting Association; Honorary Doctorate, University of Macedonia; The University Medal for Contribution to Scholarship, Athens University of Economics and Business

Academic background
- Education: Cairo University; Indiana University; University of Illinois at Urbana–Champaign
- Thesis: An Empirical Investigation of the Effect of Aggregation on Lending Decisions (1972)

Academic work
- Institutions: Gies College of Business, University of Illinois at Urbana–Champaign

Ahmed Rashad Abdel-khalik is an Egyptian-American scholar. He is the V. K. Zimmerman Professor of International Accounting, Professor of Accountancy, and Director of the V. K. Zimmerman Center for International Education and Research in Accounting at University of Illinois at Urbana–Champaign.

Abdel-khalik conducts empirical research in accounting, focusing on financial reporting, accounting for risk, hedge accounting, research methodology, and current issues in accounting standards. He has authored several books including Accounting for Risk, Hedging and Complex Contracts (2013), BRAZE N: Big Banks, Swap Mania and the Fallout (2019), and Empirical Research in Accounting: A Methodological View point (1979).

Abdel-khalik was the founding editor of Journal of Accounting Literature from 1980 till 1989 and the senior editor of The Accounting Review from 1990 through 1994. He has been the senior editor of the International Journal of Accounting since 2000.

== Education ==
Abdel-khalik graduated with honors from Cairo University in 1961. He then moved to the United States and received his Master of Business Administration and M.A. degrees in economics from Indiana University in 1965 and 1966, respectively. In 1972, Abdel-khalik received his Ph.D. degree in Accountancy from University of Illinois at Urbana-Champaign.

== Career ==
Abdel-khalik worked briefly at the National Bank of Egypt and at Cairo University, before moving to the U.S. for his graduate studies at Indiana University. He interrupted his studies to join the University of North Carolina at Charlotte as an instructor in economics (1967–1969). He joined Columbia University as an assistant professor after completing his Ph.D.

In 1975, Abdel-khalik joined Duke University as an associate professor, then the University of Florida as the Walter J. Matherly Professor in 1977, and later held an appointment as graduate research professor from 1980 till 2001. During his term at University of Florida, Abdel-Khalik was the director of the Accounting Research Center from 1977 till 2000.

In 2000, he was appointed by University of Illinois at Urbana-Champaign as a professor of accountancy and director of the V. K. Zimmerman Center for International Education and Research in Accounting. The Zimmerman Center sponsors The International Journal of Accounting and The Illinois International Accounting Symposium. He became the V. K. Zimmerman Professor of International Accounting in 2012.

== Research ==
Abdel-khalik has conducted research focusing on accounting and reporting risk, impact of accounting disclosure on decision making and security prices, research methodology, and contemporary development in accounting standards. In late 1990s, Abdel-khalik began focusing on the sub-topics of financial derivatives, valuation of basic derivative instruments and hedge accounting. The knowledge that the notional amounts of over-the-counter (OTC) derivatives exceeded eight times the size of Gross Domestic Product coupled with a complex set of accounting standards led him to develop a course on accounting for derivatives and hedge accounting, which resulted in authoring two books: Accounting for Risk, Hedging and Complex Contracts, BRAZEN: Big Banks, Swap Mania and the Fallout, and several articles on the magnitude and potential severity of attendant consequences.

His book, BRAZEN Big Banks, Swap Mania and the Fallout, was published in 2019 and is based on the widespread and highly costly impact of interest rate swap (IRS) contracts on nonprofit organizations and the public service sector. He presented the details of several cases which he used as samples from different segments of nonprofits. The book reflects his concern for the societal impact of the significant wealth transfers from nonprofits and the public service sector to big banks to settle obligations arising from being counterparties to IRS. The one-direction flow of huge amounts of funds occurred over a sustained period of time.

=== Empirical research in accounting ===
Abdel-khalik conducted an empirical study regarding the usefulness of disaggregated financial information for commercial lending decision making. His research indicated that perceived risk of borrowing firms is negatively influenced by greater aggregation of information in financial reports, especially when the financial conditions of the borrower are marginal. He also became interested in the role of CEOs' risk aversion on key indicators and decisions. In 2007, he published a paper titled "An Empirical Analysis of CEO Risk Aversion and the Propensity to Smooth Earnings Volatility" and in 2014 he published another article titled "CEO Risk Aversion and R & D Expenditures." His findings in these articles revealed negative relationship between the degree of risk aversion and the volatility of performance measures as well as between risk aversion and levels of expenditures on R&D. In 2015, Abdel-khalik, jointly with Po-Chang Chen, published a paper linking the growth in OTC derivatives and accounting. They found that the use of cash flow hedge accounting treatment helps reduce earnings volatility/equity risk, and that firms increase their use of non-trading derivatives when facing high level of earnings volatility.

In the late 1990s, Abdel-khalik published a paper on China's A and B shares and the information environment regarding the only two types of shares that existed at the time. He employed an event-study approach and found correlation between earnings and unexpected returns for A shares but not for B shares, which at that time were restricted to investment by foreign institutions. He also highlighted various possible institutional explanations for the study results.

In 2017, Abdel-khalik published an article showing that, for an entire decade, Enron Corporation has borrowed huge amounts of money from both JPMorgan Chase and Citibank under contracts camouflaged as derivative contracts of commodity swaps, but reported these loans as sales revenues and as cash flow from operations. These disguised loans allowed Enron to survive nine years longer than it would have otherwise. In 2019, Abdel-khalik published a paper critical of some aspects of accounting standards which reflects his recent research genre.

=== Internal and external auditing ===
Abdel-khalik published a paper regarding the motivation of private company owners' demand for audit assurance. According to his study, the owners view audits as compensatory control systems for the organizational loss of control. In another article, he applied self-selection bias in audit pricing and presented a method for direct evaluation of knowledge spillover costs from audits to management advisory services.

Abdel-khalik conducted two experiments in the 1980s and presented the findings regarding the effects of various organizational structures on external auditors planning audit programs.

=== Transfer pricing ===
Abdel-khalik studied Myron Gordon's model of transfer pricing system and published a paper indicating that Gordon's model could, under certain conditions, result in promoting inefficient behavior by employees or management. He also presented possible solutions and extensions to the model. Additionally, in another study he assessed the value of major transfer pricing models and discussed their development in the context of a firm's economic performance.

=== Information processing ===
Abdel-khalik and Thomas Keller conducted an experiment on the decision effects of changes in earnings vs. changes in cash flow. The American Accounting Association published their findings in a monograph in 1979 noting the results show that analysts are fixated on following accounting earnings even when cash flow from operations is more informative. Abdel-khalik also conducted an experiment with K. M. El-Sheshai on human judgement showing that the choice of information cues influences the utilization of these cues in making decisions and on the efficiency of human information processing. He, with Bippin Ajinkya, investigated if earnings forecast revisions are reflected in security prices during the period when they were private information as compared to later periods when these forecasts became public. They found results consistent with the semi-strong form of market efficiency—private information are not reflected in security prices.

== Awards and honors ==
- 1961 – Cairo University, Graduation Honors
- 1971-1972 - Ernst and Ernst Fellow
- 1971, 1973 - Competitive Manuscript Contest Awards, The American Accounting Association
- 1989 - Wildman Award, American Accounting Association and Deloitte and Touche
- 2004 - The University Medal for Contribution to Scholarship, Athens University of Economics and Business
- 2016 - Honorary Doctorate, University of Macedonia

== Bibliography ==
=== Books ===
- The Economic Effects on Lessees of FASB Statement No. 13, Accounting for Leases (1981) ISBN 978-9992929766
- The Impact of Accounting Research on Practice and Disclosure (1978) ISBN 9780822303961
- Empirical Research in Accounting: A Methodological Viewpoint (1979) ISBN 9780865390324
- Research Opportunities in Auditing: The Second Decade (1989) ISBN 9789999108843
- Accounting for Risk, Hedging and Complex Contracts (2013) ISBN 9781136489297
- BRAZEN: Big Banks, Swap Mania and the Fallout (2019) ISBN 9789813275584

=== Selected articles ===
- (1973). "The Effect of Aggregating Accounting Data on the Lending Decision: An Empirical Investigation," Empirical Research in Accounting: Selected Studies, Journal of Accounting Research, Vol. 11. pp. 104–138.
- (1980). "Information choice and utilization in an experiment on default prediction." Journal of Accounting Research, 325–342.
- (1990). "The jointness of audit fees and demand for MAS: A self-selection analysis." Contemporary Accounting Research, 6(2), 295–322.
- (1993). "Why do private companies demand auditing? A case for organizational loss of control." Journal of accounting, auditing & finance, 8(1), 31–52.
- (2014). "CEO Risk Aversion and R & D Expenditures," ABACUS. A Journal of Accounting, Finance, and Business Studies, Vol. 50, No. 3, pp. 245–278.
- (2019). "How Enron Used Accounting for Prepaid Commodity Swaps to Delay Bankruptcy for One Decade: The Shadowy Relationships With Big Banks". Journal of Accounting, Auditing and Finance., pp. 309–328.
