= Soliño =

Soliño is a Spanish surname. Notable people with the surname include:

- María Soliño (1551–?), Spanish woman accused of witchcraft
- María Amelia López Soliño (1911–2009), Spanish blogger
- Norberto Soliño (1902–?), cinematographer and businessman
