= Cangas Left Alternative =

Cangas Left Alternative Alternativa Canguesa de Esquerda
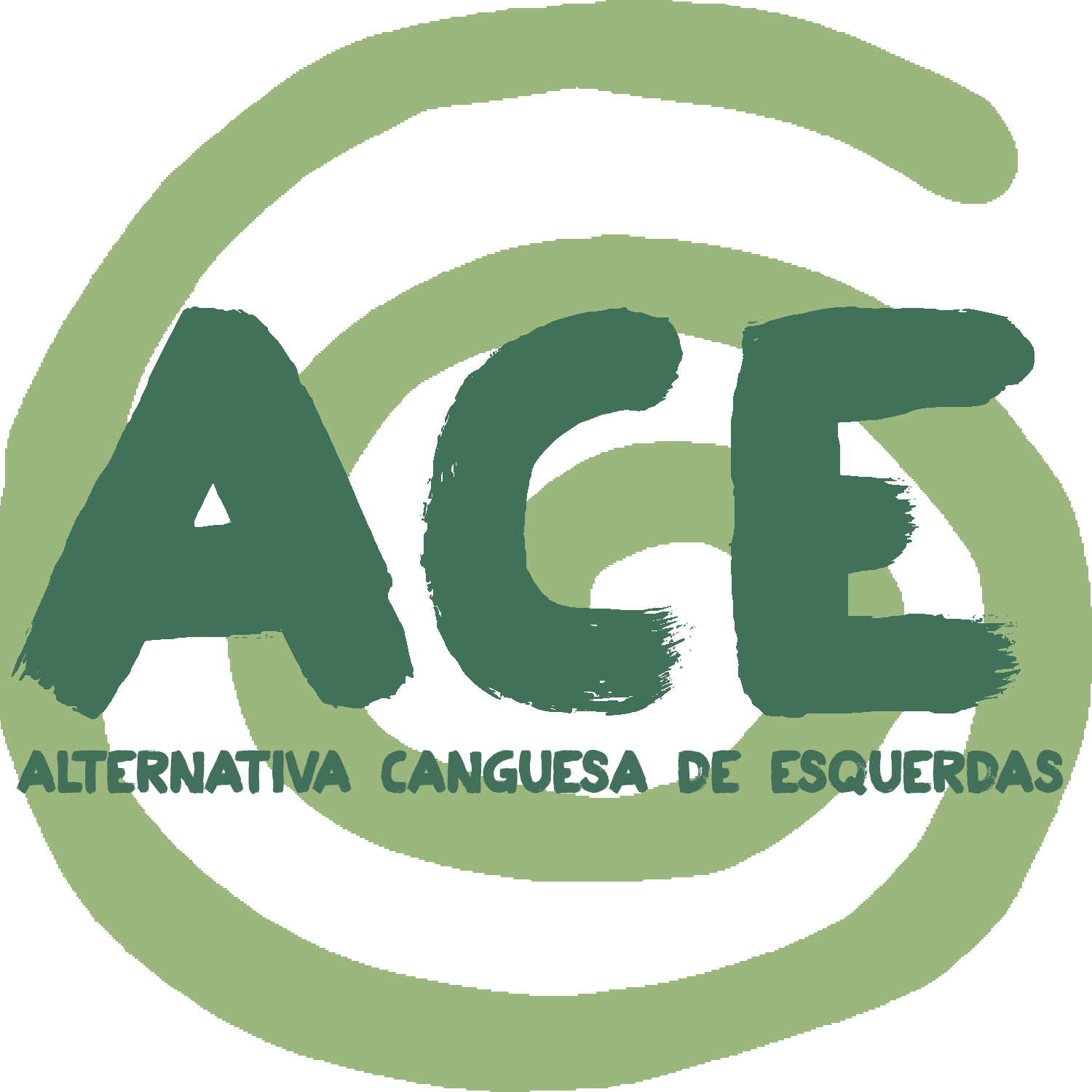
- Leader: Xosé Manuel Pazos; Mariano Abalo
- Founded: 2007
- Merged into: Galician People's Front; United Left; Communist Party of the Galician People; Independents
- Ideology: Communism; Ecologism
- Political position: Left-wing
- City council of Cangas: 4 / 21

Website
- acesquerdas.org

Cangas Left Alternative (Alternativa Canguesa de Esquerda in Galician language; ACE) is a coalition of 3 political parties and various independents in the municipality of Cangas, Pontevedra.

== History ==
In the municipal elections of May 27, 2007 ACE gained 1,890 votes, the 13.1% of the total vote, and three councilors out of a total of 21. ACE supported and participated in a government of the Galician Nationalist Bloc (BNG) and the Socialists' Party of Galicia (PSdG). On January 28, 2010 ACE broke the agreement (in a decision that was taken in an open assembly) due to the supposed attacks of the BNG against the elected representatives of ACE. ACE supported a local social movement called A Ría Non se Vende (The ría is not for sale) against the plans of the local government to build a new port in an area with historic and natural values. 49 neighbors of Cangas were judged due to the incidents during the demonstrations against the new port, including various members of ACE.

In 2011 ACE reached 1,744 votes, which accounted for the 12.77% of the vote, keeping the 3 Councillors. In the local elections of 2015 ACE gained 4 town councillors (2 of the Galician People's Front and two of the United Left) and, for the first time, the mayorship of the municipality thanks to a pact with the BNG and Assembly for Unity (ASpUN).

In the 2023 election the ACE called for a vote for Alternativa dos Veciños (AV). The party gained 863 votes (6,4%) and one seat.

== Election results ==
Election	Municipal council of Cangas				
Election	Votes	%	Position	Seats	+/–
2007	1,890	13.11	2º	3 / 21	▲2 (Note: Compared to the Galician People's Front list results in 2003.)
2011	1,744	12.77	4º	3 / 21	=
2015	2,268	17.14	2º	4 / 21	▲1
2019	2,301	16.98	2º	4 / 21	=

== See also ==
- SON
