= Rodas Beach =

Beach in Galicia, Spain

Coordinates: 42°13′33.05″N 8°54′5.45″W

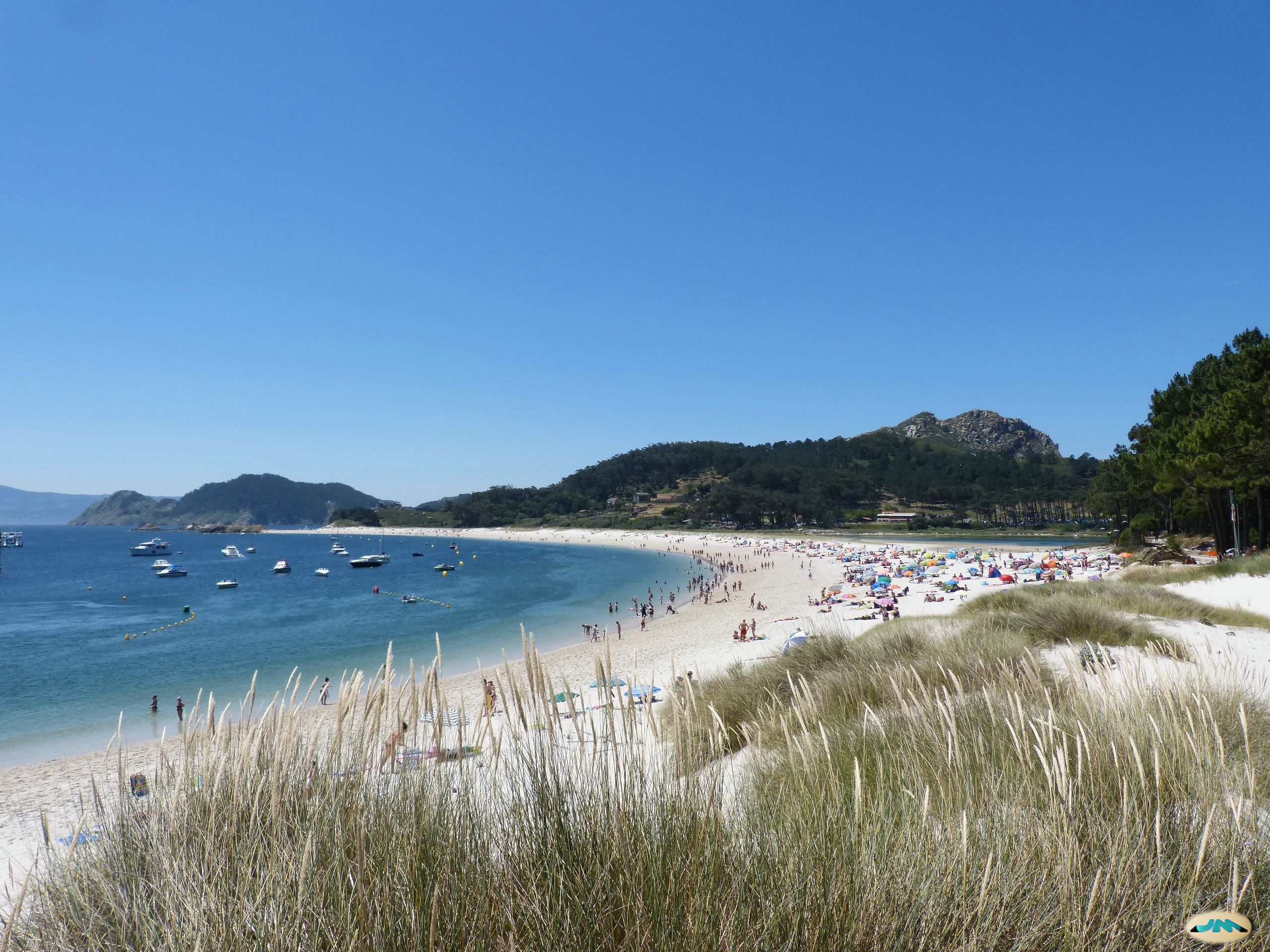
Beach view from the Monteagudo island

Rodas Beach (Galician: Praia de Rodas, Spanish: Playa de Rodas) is a slightly curved beach of about 1,200 metres long on the Spanish Cíes Islands, part of Atlantic Islands of Galicia National Park. It forms an isthmus between Monteagudo and Faro islands. To the east lies the Vigo estuary, while to the west it opens onto a lagoon.

The beach gained international recognition in 2007 when the British newspaper The Guardian named it "the best beach in the world", describing it as "a perfect crescent of soft, pale sand backed by small dunes sheltering a calm lagoon of crystal-clear sea".
