= Susan L. Douglass =

American teacher

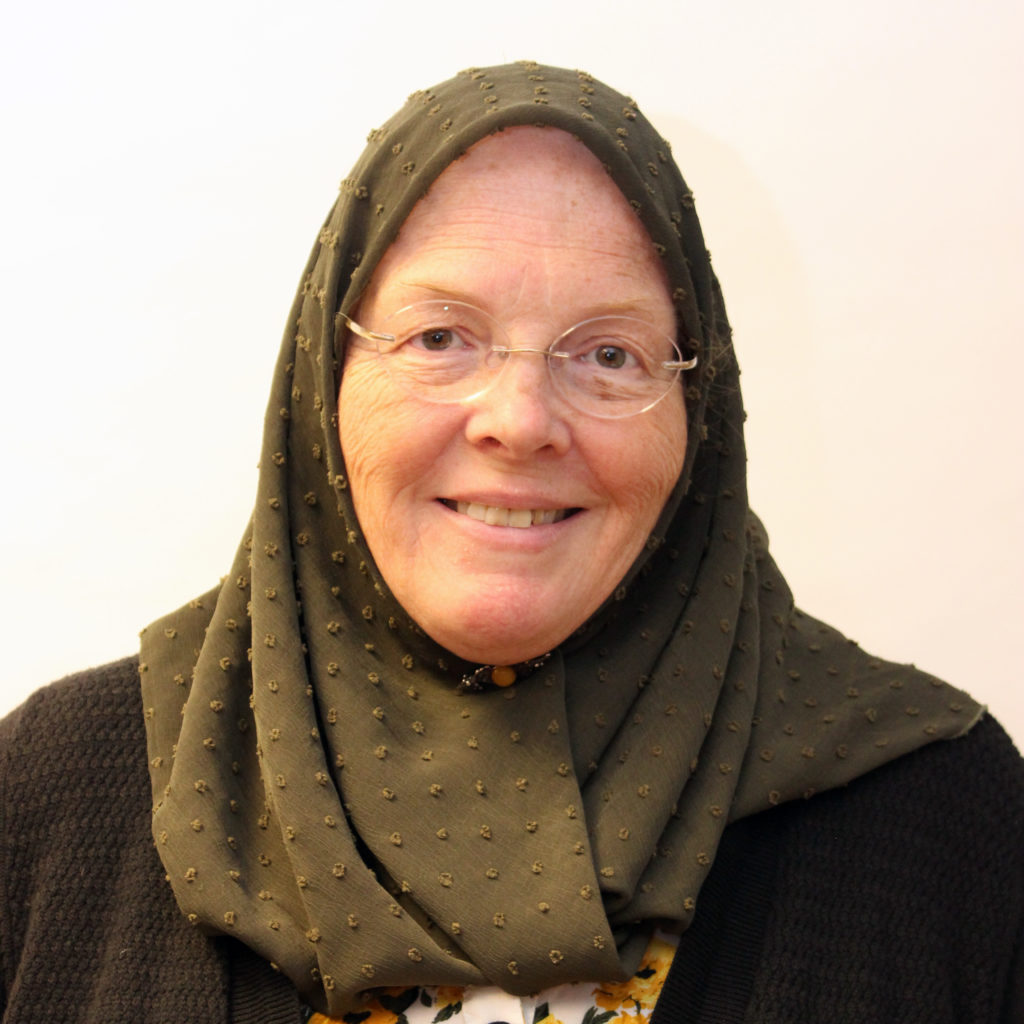
Dr. Susan Douglass (2017)

Susan L. Douglass is a former social studies teacher and author affiliated with the Council on Islamic Education. She is a senior research associate at the Ali Vural Ak Center for Global Islamic Studies at George Mason University. She was formerly affiliated with the Prince Alaweed bin-Talal Center for Muslim Christian Understanding at Georgetown University.

Douglass holds a M.A. in Arab Studies from Georgetown University and a B.A. in history from the University of Rochester. She was an advisor to the 2002 PBS broadcast documentary Muhammad: Legacy of a Prophet (2002). Douglass is an American-born Muslim.

== Books ==
- World Eras: Rise and Spread of Islam, 622-1500 (Thompson/Gale, 2002)
- Ramadan (Carolrhoda Books, 2002),
