= Salix × forbyana =

Scientific classification
- Kingdom: Plantae
- Clade: Tracheophytes
- Clade: Angiosperms
- Clade: Eudicots
- Clade: Rosids
- Order: Malpighiales
- Family: Salicaceae
- Genus: Salix
- Species: S. × forbyana

Binomial name
- Salix × forbyana Sm., 1804

Species of plant in the willow family

Salix × forbyana is a species of hybrid willow native to the British Isles and Western Europe. It is commonly called the Fine Osier. It is a hybrid of Salix atrocinerea, Salix purpurea, and Salix viminalis. It was first described in 1804 by James Edward Smith in Flora Britannica V3.
