= History Alive! textbooks =

American history textbooks

- Genre: Social studies
- Publisher: Teachers' Curriculum Institute
- Publication date: 2024

History Alive! The Medieval World and Beyond is a series of social studies and history textbooks published by Teachers' Curriculum Institute (TCI).

TCI was cofounded by Jim Lobdell.

== Reports of bias ==
Conservative outlets have objected to the presentation of material in the textbook.

In 2003, J Weekly, a Northern California Jewish news blog, highlighted the book's adoption in a Santa Rosa, California high school. After a parent complained about anti-Israel bias, the Jewish Community Relations Council reported on the problems in the book, then sent it to Alan Dershowitz, who concurred. The region's Anti-Defamation League also got involved. By the following year, TCI planned to update the book. The Jewish Telegraphic Agency noted the Council on Islamic Education and the Islamist, anti-Israel scholar Ayad Al-Qazzaz both consulted on the creation of History Alive!, while the Jewish community had failed to present a similarly unified review of textbooks.

In 2005, Daniel Pipes, described as an Islamophobe or anti-Arab propagandist, and creator of Campus Watch, published a comment on his site about Islamic indoctrination in the History Alive! textbook, which was being trialed in the district, as did Cinnamon Stilwell in the San Francisco Chronicle; Stilwell is a conservative commentator who has written for Campus Watch. It was then picked up by Little Green Footballs, which was a conservative site at the time, and by other conservative blogs, which also claimed the book had an anti-Jewish bias. A group called The Textbook League said that TCI had consulted with Islamic Networks Group, which it called "a Muslim propaganda agency".

By a month later (March 2005) the district had received enough emails and expressions of concern that they stopped their trial of the textbook.

The revisions to the textbooks were discussed in November 2005 at the California State Board of Education, which voted to allow History Alive! and other textbooks with compliance to lists of revisions.

TCI covers Islam as part of Medieval history, and covers other major world religions in the previous year of History Alive! textbook, since that is the historical era during which the respective religions developed.

== See also ==
- EdSurge
- The Revisionaries
