= Battle of Bayona Islands (1590) =

Anglo-Dutch–Spanish naval engagement

- Part of the Eighty Years' War and the Anglo-Spanish War (1585–1604)
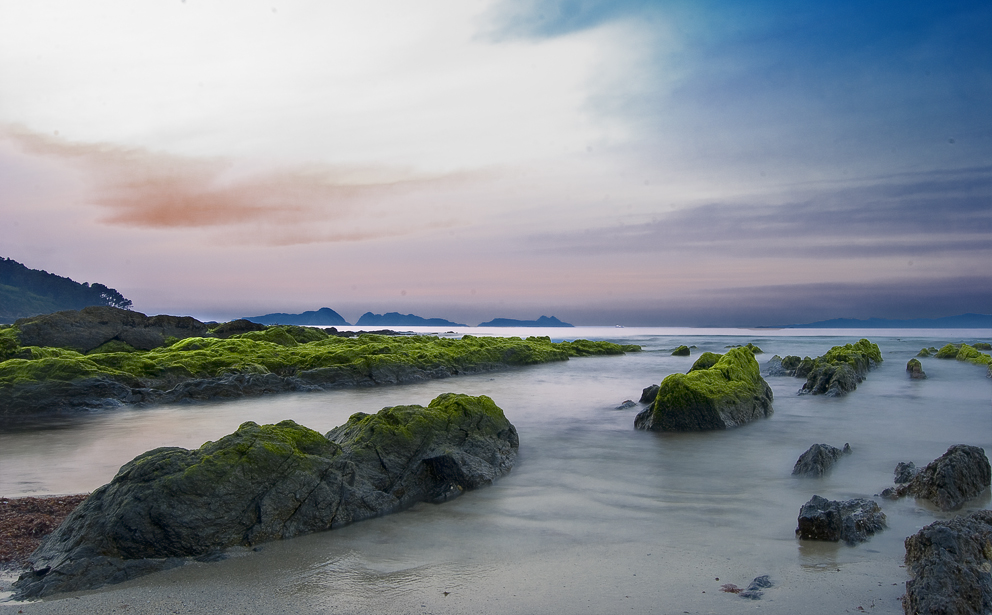
- Photography of the Cies Islands by Alberto Pérez.
Date	Early 1590
Location	Off Bayona Islands, Atlantic Ocean
Result	Spanish victory

Belligerents
Dutch Republic; England	Spain

Commanders and leaders
Unknown	Pedro de Zubiaur

Strength
14 ships	3 flyboats

Casualties and losses
14 ships captured (7 ships boarded) (Flagship boarded and captured)	Unknown

The Battle of Bayona Islands, also known as the Battle of Bayona Bay, was a naval engagement that took place in early 1590, off Bayona Islands (present-day Cíes Islands), near Bayona (or Baiona) and Vigo, Spain, between a small Spanish naval force commanded by Captain Don Pedro de Zubiaur, and an Anglo-Dutch flotilla of 14 ships, during the Eighty Years' War, and in the context of the Anglo-Spanish War (1585–1604) and the French Wars of Religion. After several hours of hard combat, the Spanish naval force composed of three flyboats achieved a great success, and the Anglo-Dutch fleet was totally defeated. The flagship of the Dutch was boarded and captured, including another six ships more. Finally, the rest of the Dutch fleet was forced to surrender. Shortly after, Pedro de Zubiaur arrived at Ferrol, along with the captured ships, with great surprise for the Spanish authorities of the port.

== See also ==
- Cies Islands
- English Armada
- Battle of the Strait of Gibraltar (1590)
- Siege of Rheinberg (1586–1590)
- French Wars of Religion
- Anglo-Spanish War (1585–1604)
