= Cíes Islands =

Archipelago off the coast of Pontevedra in Galicia, Spain

Native name: Illas Cíes
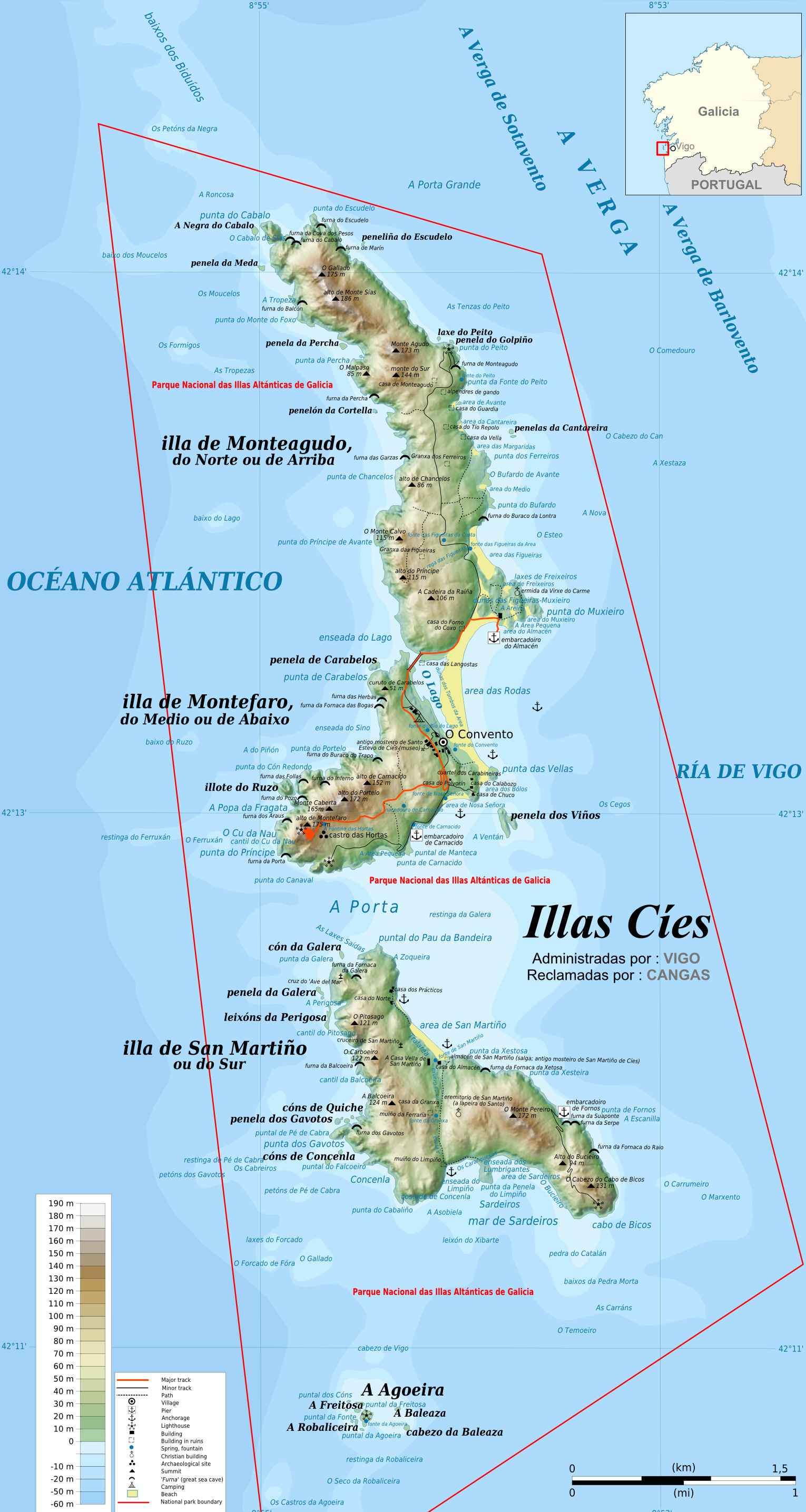
- Location and topographic map of the Cíes Islands
- Interactive map of Cíes Islands

Geography
- Coordinates: 42.223333°N 8.903889°W
- Total islands: 3
- Major islands: Monteagudo, Do Faro, San Martiño
- Highest elevation: 197 m (646 ft)

Administration
- Spain
- Autonomous Community: Galicia
- Province: Pontevedra
- Municipality: Vigo

Demographics
- Population: 3

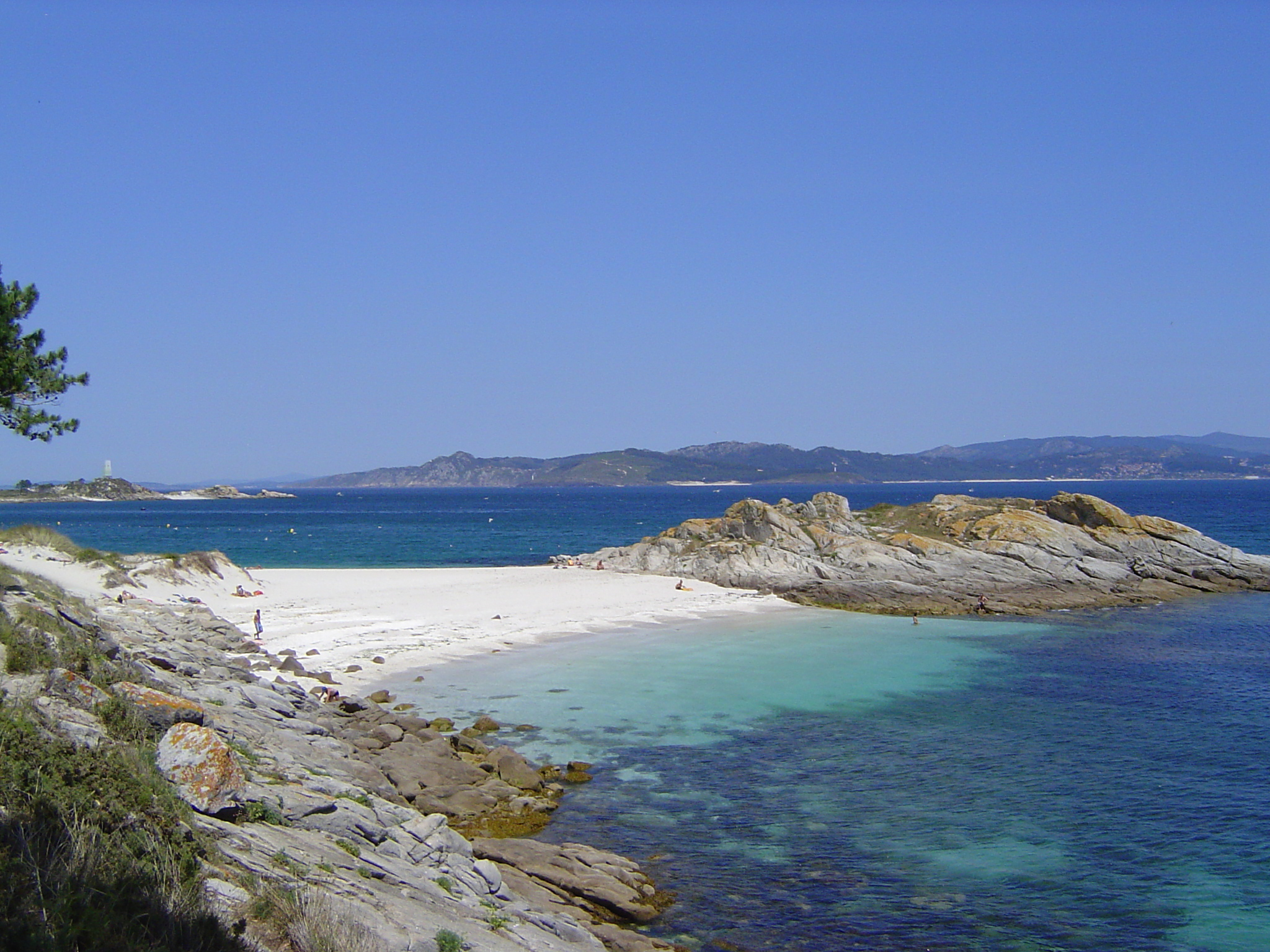
Praia dos Viños in Cíes

The Cíes Islands (Galician: Illas Cíes; Spanish: Islas Cíes) are an archipelago off the coast of Pontevedra in Galicia, Spain, in the mouth of the Ria de Vigo. They were declared a Nature Reserve in 1980 and are included in the Atlantic Islands of Galicia National Park (Parque Nacional Marítimo-Terrestre das Illas Atlánticas de Galicia) created in 2002.

== The archipelago ==
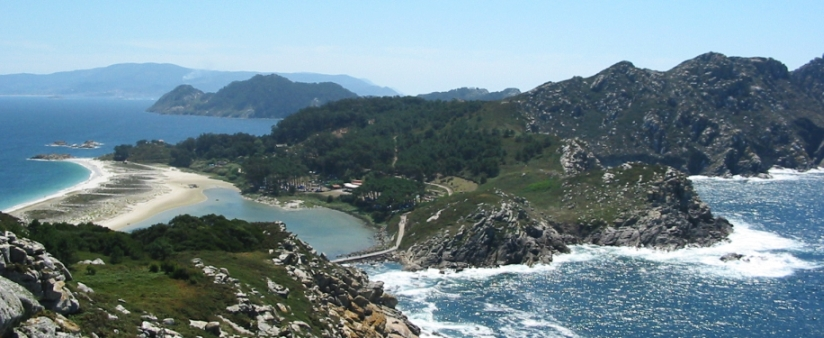
Looking South from Monte das Figueiras (Monteagudo Island)

The Cíes consist of three islands, Monteagudo ("Sharp Mount" or North Island), do Faro ("Lighthouse Island", or Illa do Medio, "Middle Island") and San Martiño ("Saint Martin" or South Island).

Monteagudo is separated from the Morrazo peninsula by the North Canal while San Martiño is separated from the coast of Santoulo cape (mount Ferro) by the Freu da Porta Strait. The Do Faro island is linked to the North island by an accumulation of sand 1,200 m (3,937 ft) long known as Rodas beach, in the eastern side of the island. During high tide the sea flows between the islands in the western side and, blocked by the beach it fills the lagoon between the sandy area and the rocks. The highest peak is the Alto das Cíes (197 m (646 ft)) in Monteagudo.

The islands formed by the end of the Tertiary, when some parts of the coast sank, creating the rías ("estuaries"). All three islands are the peaks of the coastal mountains now partially under the sea and are formed mainly of granitic rock.

The land is mountainous with rough, nearly vertical cliffs of more than 100 m (328 ft) on the western side, and numerous caves (furnas) formed by erosion from the sea and the wind. The eastern side is less steep, covered by woods and bushes and protected from the Atlantic winds, allowing the formation of beaches and dunes.

Atlantic squalls pass over the islands, unloading as they collide with the coast. Therefore, the Cíes receive more or less half the quantity of rain as the rest of the Rías Baixas.

== Nature reserve ==
Because of the high natural value of this area and its deterioration due to human activity, it was declared a Nature Reserve in 1980. The level of legal protection varied until November 21, 2000, when the Galician Parliament unanimously agreed to apply for the status of National Park to the central Government. The Spanish Congress of Deputies signed a definite agreement in June 2002, creating the National Land-Marine Park of the Atlantic Islands of Galicia, formed by a number of archipelagos, islands and cays, namely the Cíes, Ons, Sálvora, Noro, Vionta, Cortegada Island and the Malveiras.

The marine part of the Park is measured as a 100-meter-wide strip from the shore in low tide. Since 1992, underwater fishing is forbidden in the islands. National Parks are nature areas nearly untransformed by human activity that, based on their landscape, geological or ecosystems possess aesthetic, ecologic, educative or scientific values worth of special protection. Therefore, the activities that alter or endanger the stability of the ecosystem are forbidden. Some traditional activities (like traditional fishing) are allowed as long as they are compatible with the environment and the preservation of natural resources.

Since 1988, the Islands have a status of ZEPA (Zona de Especial Protección para las Aves, Spanish for Special Protection Area for Birds), and they are included in the Natura 2000 network, which develops European Union Directives in relation to habitats and birds. It contains one of the main colonies of the yellow-legged gull. The ZEPAs are protected mainly to avoid pollution and general deterioration of the places used by birds permanently or during their migrations.

== Tourism ==
In summer, boats link Monteagudo with the ports of Vigo, Baiona and Cangas. There is a camping area but permissions have to be reserved at the Vigo port. A supermarket, a visitor center and a restaurant cater for visitors. There are no waste bins on the islands. Visitors are required to take their litter back to the mainland. The Cíes Islands are composed of nine beaches with fine white sand and clear waters. In February 2007 the British newspaper The Guardian chose the beach of Rodas, on the island of Monteagudo, as "the best beach in the world." "Galegos come here to spend long, lazy summer days on the Praia das Rodas, a perfect crescent of soft, pale sand backed by small dunes sheltering a calm lagoon of crystal-clear sea", says the magazine. In 2022, the island was chosen by The New York Times, as one of the 52 Places for a Changed World, due to its efforts "to protect its environment and guard against overtourism".

== Flora ==
The scrubland is formed mainly of autochthonous species, like gorse, broom, asparagus, spurge flax (Thymelaea) or rockrose (Cistaceae).

The woodland has suffered bigger alterations, since most native species like the common fig or the pyrenaean oak (Quercus pyrenaica) are now reduced to symbolic representation by the reforestation of nearly one fourth of the surface with pine trees and eucalyptus. On the other hand, the strong winds with a high content in salt act as barrier in the development of the trees.

Some rare and representative coastal species do grow in the dunes, beaches and cliffs under very extreme climatic conditions, as the sea pink (Armeria pungens; in galician herba de namorar or "love plant"), locally endangered, and an important number of camariñas (galician common name for Corema album), an endemic species from the Iberian Peninsula western coast. Typically marshland flora (like rushes) grow in the area of the lagoon.

== Fauna ==
There is a large colony of gulls, about 22,000 pairs, and that is the dominant group in Cíes. A census in 1960 counted 400 pairs of Iberian guillemots (Uria aalge albionis), a subspecies now almost extinct on the islands. Other species include birds of prey, pigeons, petrels, pelicans, doves, woodpeckers and other types of bird, which nest in trees and cliffs. Also, there are a variety of birds wintering or resting on their migratory journeys here. In the Alto da Campa (Illa do Faro) and in the Faro do Peito (San Martiño), there are ornithological observatories. The waters around the islands are rich in biodiversity, attracting whales, dolphins, and sharks including blue sharks and basking sharks.

== Life and seabed ==
The underwater area surrounding the Cíes forms one of the richest ecosystems on the Galician coast. The most remarkable thing is an important forest of brown algae.

The perimeter of the islands has different types of environments: the cliffs, exposed to strong waves, are populated by barnacles and mussels. In its underwater part, very rocky, you can find crabs, spider crabs, lobsters and octopuses. On the beaches of the most protected areas there are many bivalve molluscs, as well as turbot, plaice and sole. The rocky but protected areas of the interior of the islands are populated by true forests of anemones and numerous sea urchins.

The waters surrounding the Cíes are usually visited by dolphins, whales and sea turtles.

The water circulation system that enters and leaves the Galician estuaries and the mixture of fresh and salt water favor the concentration of nutrients and microorganisms that are a source of food for the rest of the marine species.

Archaeological remains can also be observed on these seabeds.
