= Ángel Botello =

American painter

Ángel Botello

Ángel Botello (June 20, 1913 – November 11, 1986), full name Ángel Botello y Barros, was a Spanish-Puerto Rican painter, sculptor and graphic artist. He was dubbed "The Caribbean Gauguin" for his use of bold colors and depictions of island life. Botello is considered one of the greatest Latin American post-modern artists and recognition and demand for his artwork continues to grow today, fetching unprecedented auction prices.

Ángel Botello never attached to any particular artistic school or movement and was a protean artist: he developed his own artistic style. Botello was a versatile and many-sided artist who worked in all artistic media at his reach: oil paintings, drawing, printmaking, bronze sculptures, wood carving, photography and mosaics.

== Life and work ==
Ángel Botello was born in the small town of Cangas do Morrazo in Galicia, in the northwestern region of Spain. Botello was one of six children (four girls and two boys) of Ángel Botello y Suárez, a businessman in the fish canning industry and Bonis Barros y del Amo. Botello's father died in 1918 after contracting the Spanish influenza. In the 1920s and, after the bankruptcy of the family business, his mother and siblings moved to Bordeaux, France, and lived there until 1935. While in France, Botello's mother wanted Ángel to become a farmer but he wanted to be an architect. In France, architecture is considered a fine art rather than a science and students must take art courses. Botello and his younger brother Manuel studied during four years at the École des Beaux-Arts, from which they graduated with honors and where they excelled in drawing, painting and modeling.

In 1935 Botello returned to Spain where he applied and was accepted with a scholarship at the School of Art of the San Fernando Academy in Madrid. The few paintings that remain of the young Botello's work in France and Spain reflect an immediate break from his strictly academic training to the Impressionist and Post-Impressionist concepts and techniques that shaped his development.

The Spanish Civil War started in 1936, which made him leave his studies and join the Republican Army as a cartographer. He fought in the Spanish Civil War together with his brother Manuel, who died in the war field. In 1939, the Spanish Civil War ended with a victory for General Francisco Franco which made it impossible to stay in Spain, Botello eventually returned to France to meet with his family who were in a refugee camp.

The family decided to leave Europe and move to the Dominican Republic where he was warmly received. The community of Dominican artists included him as one of their own and many of the paintings created at this time were presented at the "Latin American Art Exposition" at the Riverside Museum in 1940.

During that year, the Botello family traveled to Cuba, where they stayed for eight months. Upon their return to Santo Domingo, his paintings were noted by the Peruvian ambassador there who invited Botello to show them in Port-au-Prince, Haiti, in 1944. After his arriving to Haiti, Botello met Christiane Auguste, who became his wife and artistic manager. After his marriage, Botello changed his artistic plans to move to Mexico to meet with the greatest Mexican artist Diego Rivera and stayed in Haiti. Botello became increasingly recognized and critically acclaimed. His Haitian landscapes and figure studies are considered to be some of his best works. In Haiti, Botello developed his artistic career of woodworking.

For ten years, the Botello family lived in Haiti until 1953 when they moved to San Juan, Puerto Rico, where they would reside permanently. By this time, he already had gained international recognition in the world of plastic arts.

A painting by Botello entitled 'Mother and Child' featured on an episode of Discovery Channel's Auction Kings during the show's second series achieving a price of $17,000.

== Botello in Puerto Rico ==
After the Botello family left Haiti and arrived in Puerto Rico in 1953, they opened their first art gallery at the Caribe Hilton Hotel. Later, they established a second art gallery in Old San Juan. Botello stated that the light and bright colors of the tropics opened a new world for him and stimulated his creativity. From the 1960s until his death in 1986 his work became more personal, as it was enriched by his new favorite theme: his three children. The deep love that he felt for his children and his family is reflected in his later paintings and sculptures.

In 1959, Botello traveled to Ravenna, Italy to learn about the mosaic technique and produced some mosaics but quickly abandoned the technique, convinced that he had mastered it.

In the 1960s, Botello became interested in printmaking after an art dealer reproduced some of his paintings using this technique. Botello refused to sign these reproductions because he was not consulted and had not worked personally on the final production of the prints. For that reason, Botello traveled to Paris, France and learned printmaking techniques. He became a master in printmaking and graphic design. Some of his best printmaking works are his linocuts, lithographs and serigraphs.

By the beginning of the 1980s, Botello started a double artistic career in painting and sculpture.

In 1985, Ángel Botello, who was a heavy smoker, was diagnosed with lung cancer and knowing that his life was in danger, then accelerated his artistic production pace and never surrendered to his illness. In the last year of his life, at age 73, Botello produced the incredible amount of 22 bronze sculptures in large format.

The 33 years that Botello lived in Puerto Rico are considered the most prolific period in his artistic career, in terms of the quality of his paintings and sculptures and the quantity of artwork produced and art media used. This artistic period of Botello in Puerto Rico has a strong figurative and surrealist influence and is the period that brought most recognition to the artist. His works of this period are known in Puerto Rico as the "Botellian Style", recognized by his caricature figures, especially girls.

Ángel Botello died in San Juan, Puerto Rico on November 11, 1986 leaving behind an impressive legacy of oil paintings, lithographs, linocuts, serigraphs and bronze sculptures. His former house located at Old San Juan, Puerto Rico now is an art gallery where his paintings, sculptures and artwork of other outstanding Puerto Rican and international artists are displayed.

== Selected exhibitions ==
- Pratt Institute, Exxon Exhibition, 1972
- Ponce Museum of Art, Puerto Rico, 1977
- Nahan Galleries Art Expo, Washington DC and New York, 1980
- La Galerie Des Serbes Cannes, France, 1987
- Sotheby's, New York, 1987
- Christie's, London, 1990

== Permanent collections ==
- Bahia Beach Resort, Rio Grande, Puerto Rico
- Caixa Vigo, Spain
- Compañía de Turismo: Ventana al Mar, San Juan, Puerto Rico
- Hakone Art Museum, Hakone, Japan
- Harn Museum of Art, Gainesville, FL
- Hotel El Conquistador, Fajardo, Puerto Rico
- Kennedy Center, Washington, DC
- Fresno Art Institute, Fresno, California
- Dayton Art Institute, Dayton, Ohio
- George Washington University, Washington, DC
- Hispanic Museum, New York
- Museo Bellapart, Santo Domingo, Republica Dominicana
- Museo de Arte de Ponce, Ponce, Puerto Rico
- Museo de Arte de Puerto Rico, San Juan, Puerto Rico
- Museo de Antropologia, Historia y Arte de la Universidad de Puerto Rico
- Museo del Barrio, New York
- Museum of Latin American Art, Los Angeles, CA

== See also ==
- List of Puerto Ricans
