= Control and indicating equipment =

Control and indicating equipment is equipment for receiving, processing, controlling, indicating and initiating the onward transmission of information as used in fire alarm systems. The fire detection and fire alarm system subcommittee of ISO/TC 21, Equipment for Fire Protection and Fire Fighting, had oversight for development of five standards covering detectors, control and indicating equipment. ISO 7240-2:3003 specifies requirements, test methods and performance criteria for control and indicating equipment (c.i.e.) for use in fire detection and fire alarm systems installed in buildings.

== By country ==
The Australian CSIRO under the Active Fire Protection Equipment Scheme sets the technical specifications and standards for lead acid batteries in Control and Indicating Equipment.

The United Kingdom Loss Prevention Council sets requirements for the design and testing of control and indicating equipment (CIE) for use with intruder alarm and hold-up alarm systems. It covers two grades of CIE (Grade A and Grade B).

Shuichi Murao was granted a United States patent on May 29, 2001 for a fire alarm system for use in control and indicating equipment.
