= Cortegada Island =

Island in Galicia, Spain

Cortegada
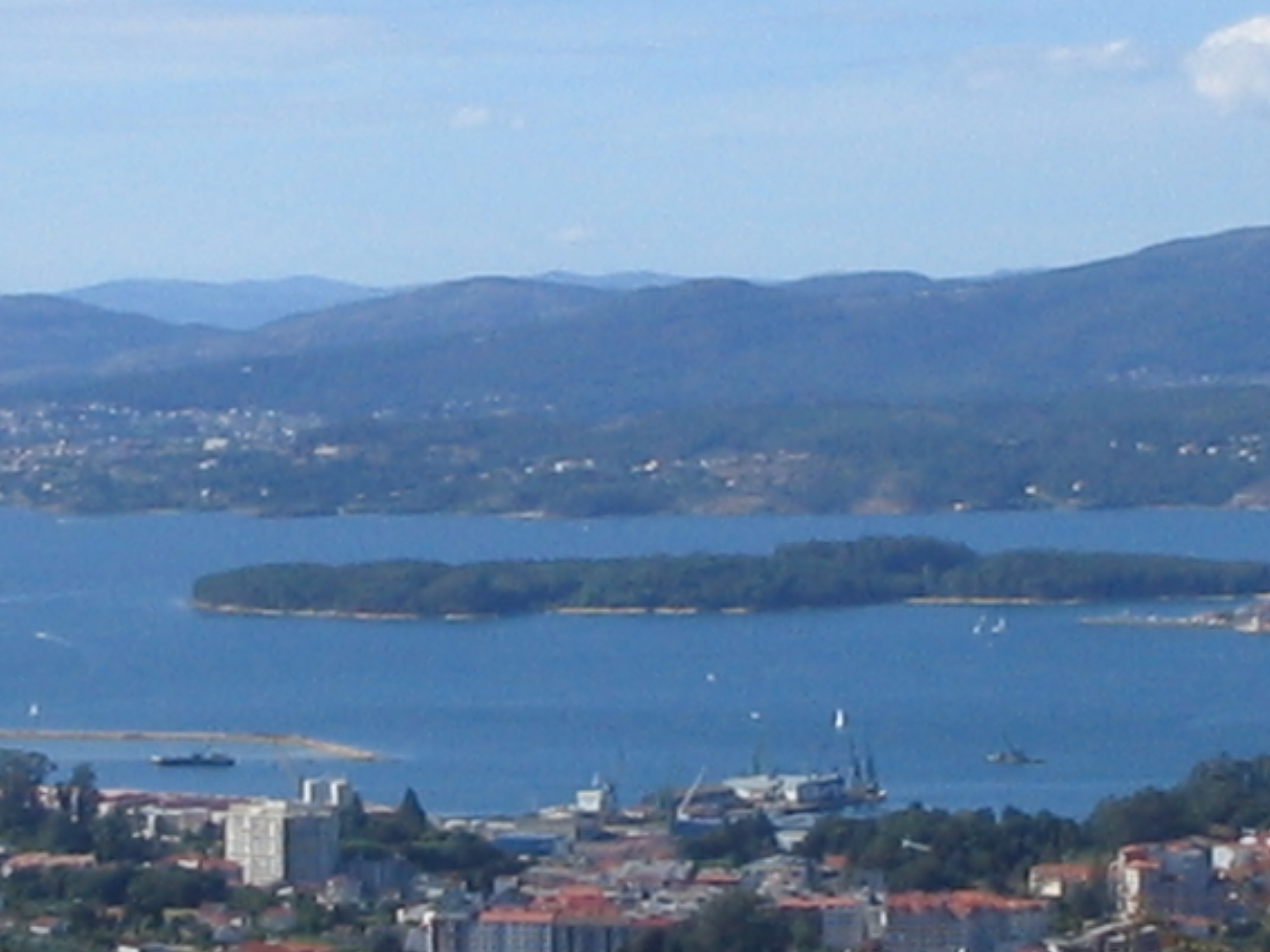
- Cortegada island

- Location within Spain Location within Galicia Location within the Province of Pontevedra

Geography
- Location: North Atlantic Ocean
- Coordinates: 42.61861°N 8.78486°W
- Area: 2.5 km^{2} (0.97 sq mi)
- Highest elevation: 20 m (70 ft)

Administration
- Spain
- Autonomous community: Galicia
- Province: Pontevedra

Demographics
- Population: 0

Cortegada is an almost tidal island (it is possible to walk there at the lowest tides, but a small amount of water always remains) in a coastal inlet near Pontevedra in Galicia, Spain. It is part of the Atlantic Islands of Galicia National Park.

== Location ==
Cortegada island is part of an archipelago that includes the Malveiras Islands or Briñas Islands, Cies, Ons, and Salvora, and—the largest and the most populated one—A Illa de Arousa. Cortegada, due to its location near the mouth of the river Ulla, is sheltered from the wind within an estuary named "ría de Arousa". This and its topography give it environmental conditions more favourable to hydrophilic woodland than the other islands of the National Park.

The island is connected to the mainland via a tidal causeway, a trackway 189 metres wide covered at high tide and revealed at low tide. A track was built on the sandbar and it has stabilized a breeding ground for clams as a commercial clam hatchery. The tides in the area change quickly, and can be dangerous for pedestrians on the causeway.

== History ==
Originally the site of a village of the municipally of O Carril (today Vilagarcía de Arousa), at the start of the 20th century, Cortegada was expropriated from its 211 tenants, on the initiative of a local businessman, with the intention of building a royal summer retreat. Offered as a present to King Alfonso XIII of Spain, who visited the island just once. in September 1907, Cortegada was sold by his son Don Juan de Borbón in 1978 to a private company. It was recently bought back by the government and added to the Atlantic Islands of Galicia National Park. The island had been inhabited until the late 19th century and used to site a monastery, hospital and leper house or lazar house. It has the remains of several stone houses, sheds and storerooms, a 17th-century stone chapel and a dock.

The island has been transformed by man. The nutrients supplied by human action created a fertile topsoil. Fertilization due to crops, livestock excrement and bird colonies has caused a change in soil composition favoring some species over others. In 2007, in a TV documentary for public television of Galicia some old people descended from islanders, recalled how the island was divided into farms and agricultural land, without tree cover. The present day laurel woods are descended from isolated examples in orchards.

== Characteristics ==
Cortegada has an oceanic climate with warm summers, and cool mild winters. The dense moisture from the ocean is precipitating constantly. Warm moist air masses blowing off the ocean are forced upwards by the terrain, which cools the air mass to the dew point, causing the moisture in the air to condense as rain or fog, creating a habitat characterized by cool, moist conditions in the air and soil. The resulting climate is wetter and mild, with the annual oscillation of the temperature moderated by the ocean. It has two main fresh water sources: a seasonal lagoon and subterranean fresh water. This last source is peculiar since the island is surrounded by salt water, everybody can dig a well without effort even near the beach, without the need of digging further than several tens of centimetres, around ten inches at the most. The island is almost flat, its highest elevation is 22 feet high. It has an area of 54 hectares of land with a rectangle shape. Due to the large amount of water in the terrain, it flows in streams everywhere or stay quiet in ponds and puddles. The water drips, cover and soak the plants, rocks, soil, logs, moss etc. and still the water is being impassable the island during heavy rain. However the beauty of the set make it a tourist attraction.

== Ecology ==
Cortegada island is valued by many researchers and scientists, as well as by the richness of its sea, for having on its north side the largest forest of bay laurel that exists in Europe. Ligustrum, Buxus, and bitter orange are some other species on Cortegada with laurel tree shape. From a distance, the island appears to be completely covered with dense woodland; it is renowned for having the last wild laurel forest of Galicia as well as a mixed population of stone pine (Pinus pinea) and maritime pine (Pinus pinaster), and a large oak forest with Quercus robur, Quercus suber, and Quercus pyrenaica. This forest formerly covered much of the coast and coastal mountains of the mainland surrounding and other Atlantic islands in the area with locally favourable wet climate microenvironments, but those forests have been much reduced in extent by logging, clearance for agriculture and grazing, and the invasion of exotic species.

The type forests are made up of laurel-leaved evergreen hardwood trees, reaching up to 40 m in height when older. Many of the species are endemic to islands, and harbour a rich biota of understorey plants, invertebrates, some species of lizards (Lacerta lepida, Podarcis bocagei, Chalcides striatus), slowworms (Anguis fragilis), and snakes, (Elaphe scalaris, Coronella girondica, Natrix maura). The island has some goats and wild boars (Sus scrofa), wild horses lived there until recently (Crocidura russula, Erinaceus europaeus, Talpa occidentalis), bats (Pipistrellus pipistrellus, Eptesicus serotinus, Rhinolophus ferrumequinum), feral cats (Felix catus), feral mink (Mustela vison), rabbits, mice, rats and birds such as Iberian chiffchaff, the coal tit, the great tit, woodpecker, Eurasian wryneck, collared dove, common wood pigeon, blackbird, Scolopax rusticola, greenfinch, warbler, finch, saithe, stonechat, robin, goldfinch, wagtail, black redstart, buzzard, goshawk, and peregrine falcon. Besides many seabirds species such as cormorants and shorebirds take refuge on the island and several species of gulls nest in the breeding season.

The scrubland is formed mainly of autochthonous species, like gorse, broom, spurge flax (Thymelaea), rockrose (Cistaceae), sea pink (Armeria maritima), spiny thrift (Armeria pungens), Corema album, etc. Typically the marshland flora like rushes and other grow in the area of the lagoon and the ponds.

The woodland supports a diverse understorey of ferns such as Davallia canariensis (a Macaronesian epilithic fern species) and bryophytes, which require moisture for reproduction, this vegetation besides cover the ruins of the old stone houses with mosses, lichens and creepers. There are numerous herbaceous plants such as genus Sedum, Teucrium scorodonia, stinking iris (Iris foetidissima), Xolantha guttata, Melissa officinalis, Symphytum officinalis, Vinca difformis, Aeonium sp., Hyacinthoides sp. etc. and several species of grasses.

Some evergreen climbing plants like asparagus species and Araliaceaes as Hedera helix, or Hedera iberica. Various feral fruit trees species occur, such as apple, plum and pear trees, Citrus aurantium, Vitis vinifera, common fig, hazelnut, walnut, Chesnut. The trees Salix atrocinerea, Alnus glutinosa, Platanus × hispanica Populus nigra, Ulmus, and allochthonous Cupressaceae are widespread, as are the bird-dispersed shrubs Ligustrum, honeysuckle Lonicera periclymenum, Prunus lusitanica, Prunus spinosa, Crataegus monogyna, Sorbus, Buxus, Osyris, European Mistletoe, Cornus, Taxus baccata, Ulex europaeus subsp. latebracteatus, Rubus ulmifolius, Tamus communis, and Ilex aquifolium. There are two constituent species in the genus Laurus Laurus nobilis and Laurus azorica known as Azores Laurel, a native to the laurel forests of the Azores, was also locally introduced in Cortegada Island. These recent forest are young yet with trees 18–20 m tall following the eviction of the last inhabitants. Ferns, liverworts, mosses and lichens grow up the trunks and branches. Creepers and vines complete the tangle.

A recent study found considerable genetic diversity within L. nobilis, and that L. azorica is not genetically or morphologically distinct. This populations like the Cortegada Island population, famous for its large grove of laurels, come from seeds dispersed by birds but is not indigenous to the island, as this islander forest originated spontaneously from laurel specimens that were planted after the original vegetation was destroyed. The location of the Islands in the North Atlantic Ocean maintained the humid and relatively mild climate which has allowed these forests to persist to the present day, although autochthonous vegetation was almost entirely cleared for orchards, wheat fields, subsistence crops and exotic timber plantations of eucalyptus, mostly Eucalyptus globulus, pine and oak in the past. The forest regenerated easily, its decline was due to the tremendous pressure it supported.

The most common epilithic plants are Umbilicus rupestris and the ferns Polypodium interjectum and Davallia canariensis. The willows are very numerous and the laurels of Cortegada live in the soils with standing water. The understorey of these Laurel forest is low, falling almost to the ground lined with ivy, along with some wood-sage plants (Teucrium scorodonia) and snakeroot (Arisarum vulgare). Willows (Salix atrocinerea) occupy the eastern part of the island in permanently or temporarily waterlogged soils as the only tree species, mono-specific forest, and on the west side are mixed with alder (Alnus glutinosa). The Marsh Vegetation provides food for the large herbivores.

== Gallery ==
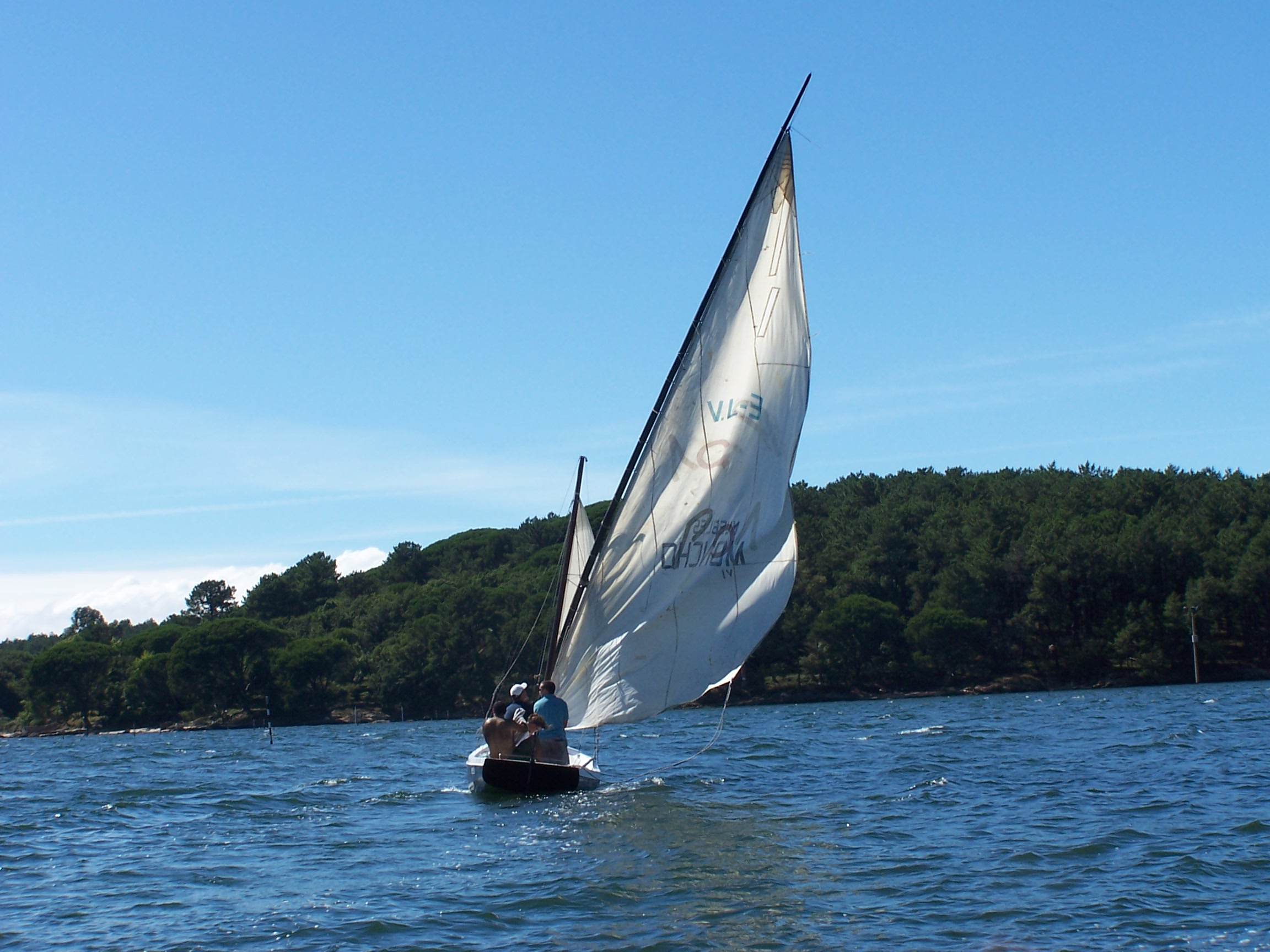
Sailboating near the island

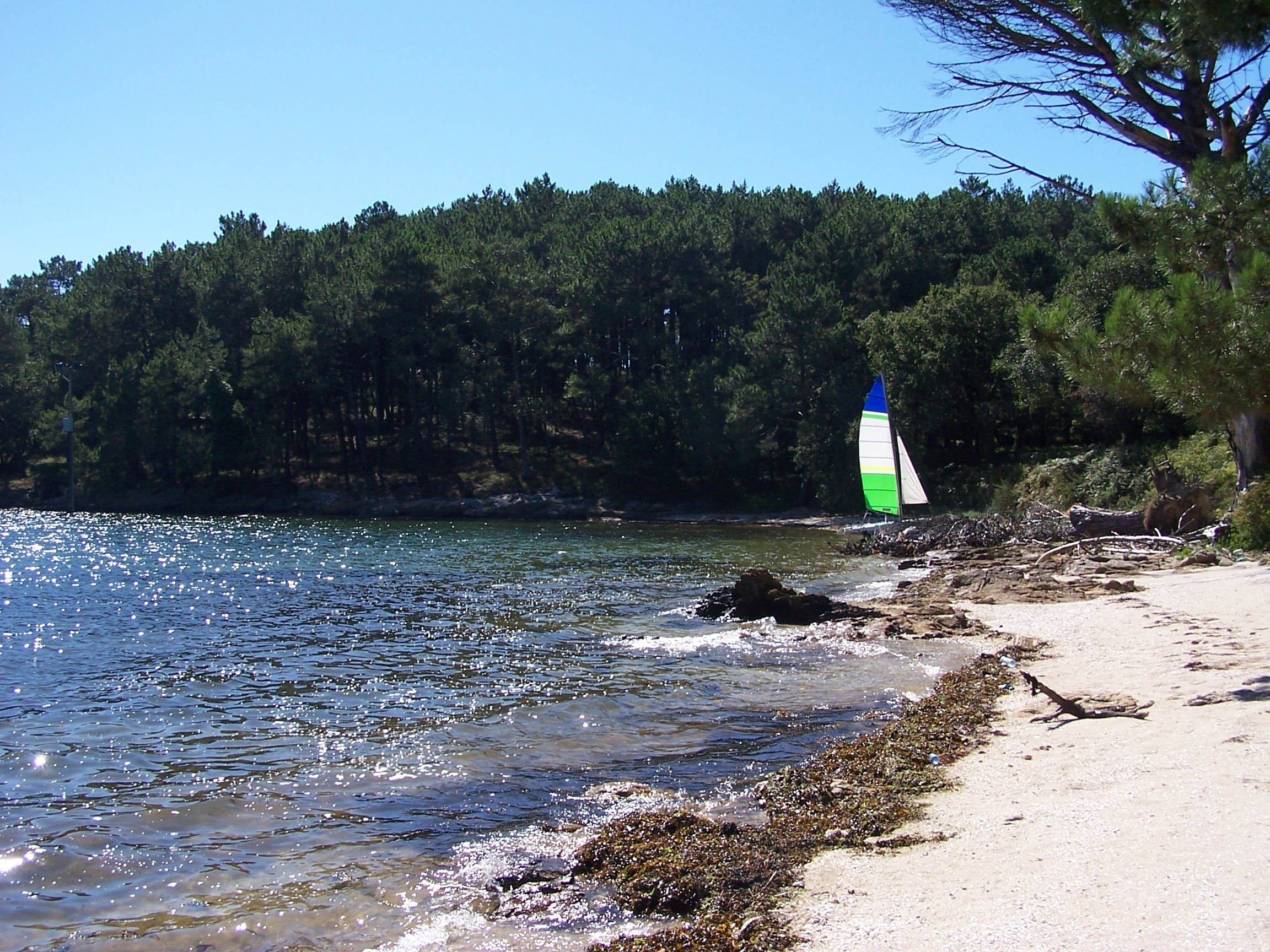
Beach of the island

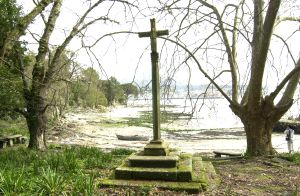
Cruceiro (Cross)

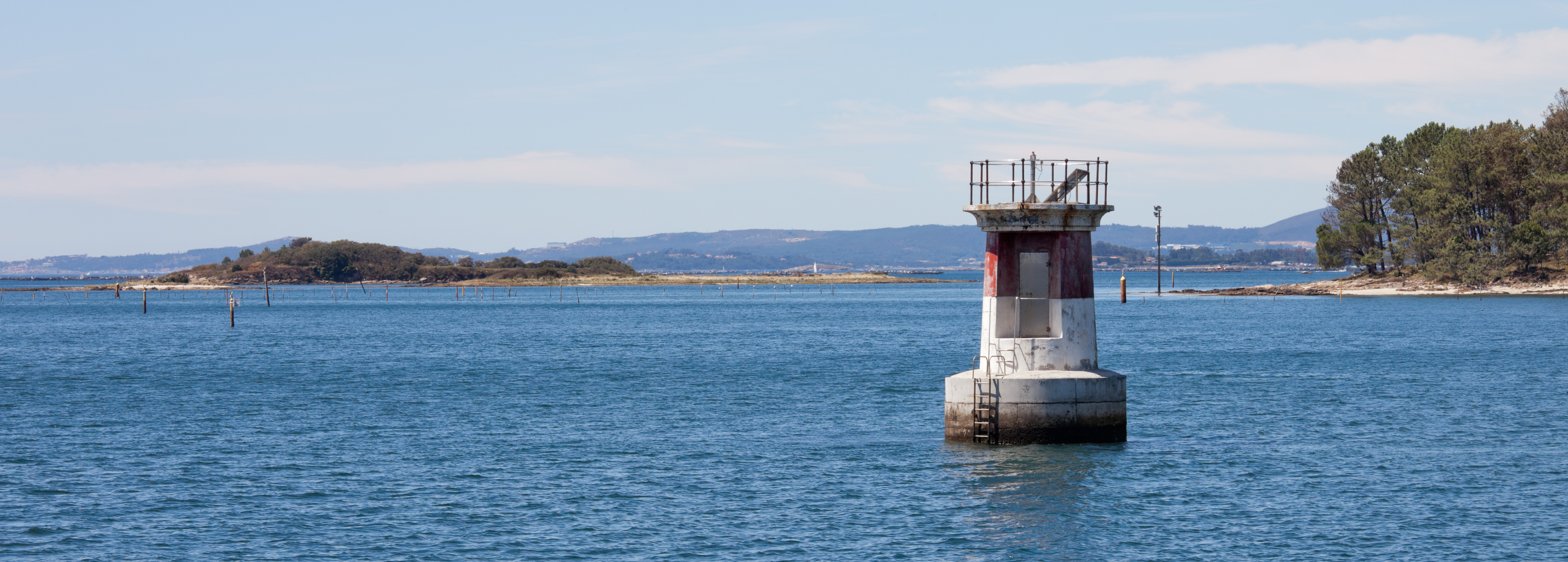
Malveiras and Briñas islands (Cortegada right)

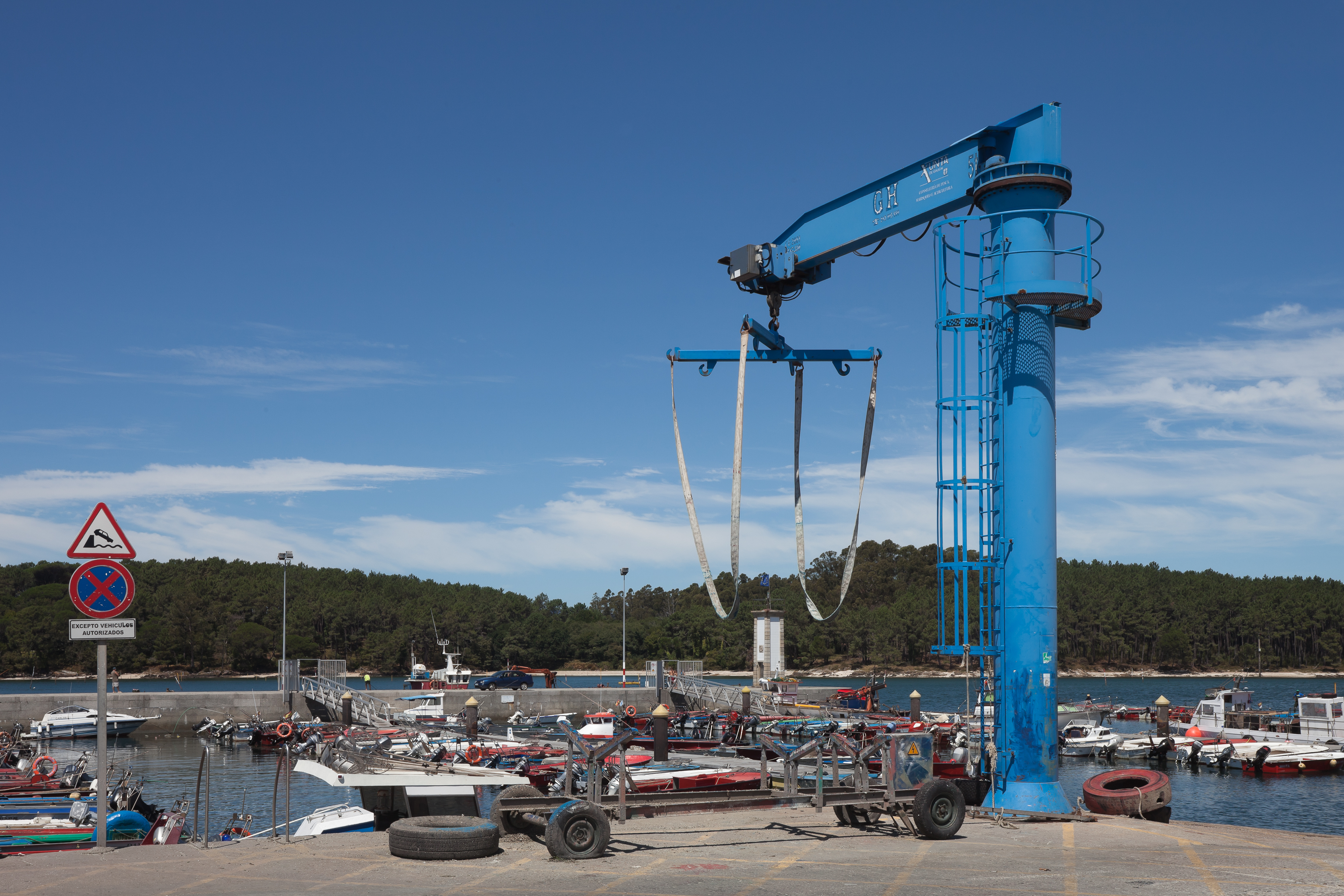
Island from the nearby port of O Carril, in Vilagarcía de Arousa
