= Regional Center for Disaster Information for Latin America and the Caribbean =

- Abbreviation: CRID
- Formation: 1990
- Type: Nonprofit Organization
- Headquarters: San José, Costa Rica
- General Director: Irene Céspedes
- Website: cridlac.org

The Regional Center for Disaster Information for Latin America and the Caribbean (CRID) is a specialized center for the region of the Americas for information on risk management. It was founded in 1990, by cooperating agencies and organizations. The goal was to create a platform for inter-sectoral coordination and collaboration to promote development of a culture of disaster risk reduction (DRR) within the region. Approaches include analysis, systematization and diffusion of information on risk management, promotion and strengthening of information centers, cooperative efforts with key players and a response to requirements from stakeholders.

== Activities ==
=== Project Management ===
- Formulate and implement information management projects for international cooperation

=== Information Management ===
- Technical assistance and preparation of training materials and resources
- Creation of information products: data collections, web portals and topical CDs, and tool standardization
- Free access to a digital information resources
- Assistance in search and selection of information

=== Information Technologies ===
- Development of document database applications and integration into existing web platforms
- Design and implementation of multi-media products for diffusion of digital audio and video collections
- Advice on indexation in specialized search engines
- Development of contact databases and integration with digital marketing tools
- Web hosting and applications
- System applications for follow-up and on-line information product statistics
- Research on the development of tools for information management

=== Communications and dissemination ===
- Advice on communications and information diffusion
- Creation of communication products: bulletins, institutional profiles on social networks, material for visibility, etc.
- Design and implementation of multi-media products for diffusion of digital audio and video collections
- Implementation of search engine optimization policies and strategies and web positioning

== FUNDACRID ==
The Foundation for Coordination of Information Resources for Disaster Prevention (FUNDACRID) is a regional cooperation agent. It contributes to sustainable development of Latin America and the Caribbean by compiling, analyzing and disseminating information for integrated risk management. It supports the strengthening and financial sustainability of CRID, as well as other initiatives for inter-institutional cooperation that serve to improve the scientific and technical information available for disaster management.

== Strategic partners ==
CRID counts among its allies national and international institutions specialized in disaster risk reduction. Historically, its closest link has been with the Pan American Health Organization (OPS) and the United Nations International Strategy for Disaster Reduction (UNISRD). Other founding partners include the International Conference of the Red Cross and Red Crescent (FICR), the Costa Rican National Commission for Risk Reduction and Emergency Assistance (CNE), the Center for Coordinating Natural Disaster Prevention in Central America (CEPREDENAC) and the Regional Office for Emergencies of Médecins sans Frontieres (MSF), which together with PAHO and IRSD appear as founding partners of CRID. Other partners include the European Commission, Humanitarian Aid and Civil Protection (DG ECHO), the National Library of Medicine of the United States (NLM), the United Nations Educational, Scientific and Cultural Organization (UNESCO) and the United Nations Children's Fund (UNICEF).

CRID forms part of the Latin American Risk Management Information Center Network (RELACIGER), whose objective is to strengthen national capabilities for compiling, standardizing and disseminating technical, educational and scientific information on disasters.

Other members of this network are the Andean Virtual Libraries for Disaster Prevention and Assistance in Bolivia, Colombia, Ecuador and Peru, the Documentation Center for the Costa Rican National Commission for Risk Reduction and Emergency Assistance (CNE), the Virtual Library on Health for Disasters in El Salvador, the Disaster Protection Center in El Salvador (CEPRODE), the Library of the National Coordination for Disaster Reduction in Guatemala (CONRED), the Virtual Library in Health and Disasters at the School of Medicine of San Carlos University in Guatemala (USAC), the National Library of Medicine at the National Autonomous University of Honduras (CIDBIMENA), the Virtual Library on Disasters at the Center for Health Research and Studies at the National Autonomous University of Nicaragua in Managua and in León (CIES/UNAN) and Civil Protection in Panama (SINAPROC).
