= Ria de Vigo =

Coordinates: 42°15′N 8°45′W

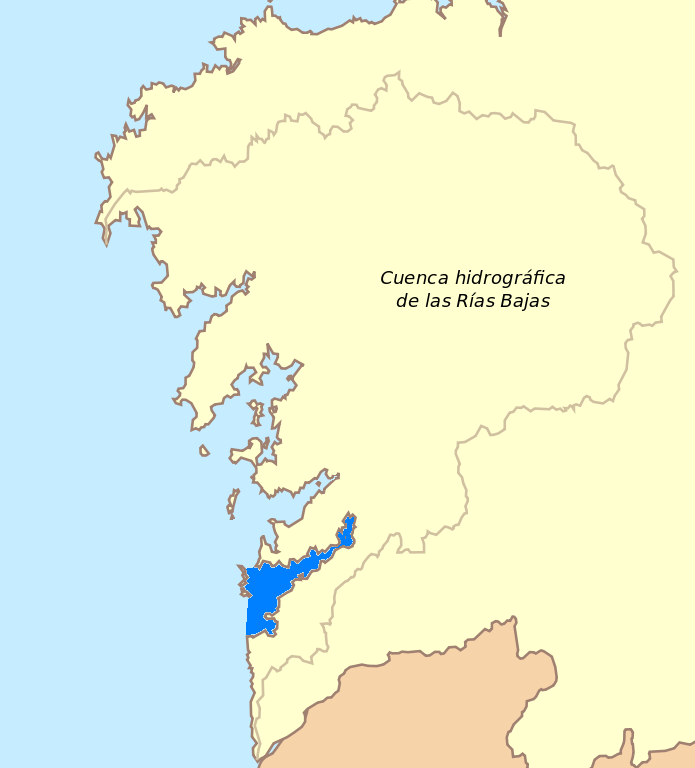
Ría de Vigo

Vigo Ria (Spanish: Ría de Vigo) and (Galician: Ría de Vigo) is an estuary in Galicia, Spain. It is the southernmost ria of the Rías Baixas. It is located in the south of the province of Pontevedra, and extends in a northeast direction over a distance of 35 kilometres (22 mi) from its mouth at Cape Silleiro to the deepest point in Arcade, with a maximum width of 7 km (4.3 mi) and the narrowest in the Strait of Rande, at 700 m (2,300 ft). Its western entrance is protected by the Cies Islands, which are part of the National Park of the Atlantic Islands which is within the islands of Toralla and San Simon. It borders to the north with the Morrazo Peninsula. In the extreme south lies the Bay of Baiona. Its easy access, depth and calm waters make the Vigo estuary an ideal retreat for sailing and water sports.

From the environmental point of view, it is a bay with a biological richness due to its water currents and deep cold waters from the north, carrying large quantities of nutrients. Historically, the Vigo estuary area has been good for fishing and shell fishing, although current conditions are not ideal due to high human and industrial activity on the coastal waterfront.

On its banks stands the city of Vigo. The municipalities of Baiona, Nigrán, Redondela, Soutomaior, Vilaboa, Moaña and Cangas do Morrazo are also situated here. It has a total population of about 420,000 inhabitants.

The Battle of Rande was fought here on October 23, 1702, more precisely at the end of the estuary, in the Ensenada de San Simón. In 1943, the following German U-boats are reported to have been sunk somewhere in the ria: German submarine U-523, sunk 25 August 1943 (17 dead and 37 survivors), and U-506, sunk at 15:50 on 12 July 1943 (48 dead and six survivors).

== Tourist activities ==
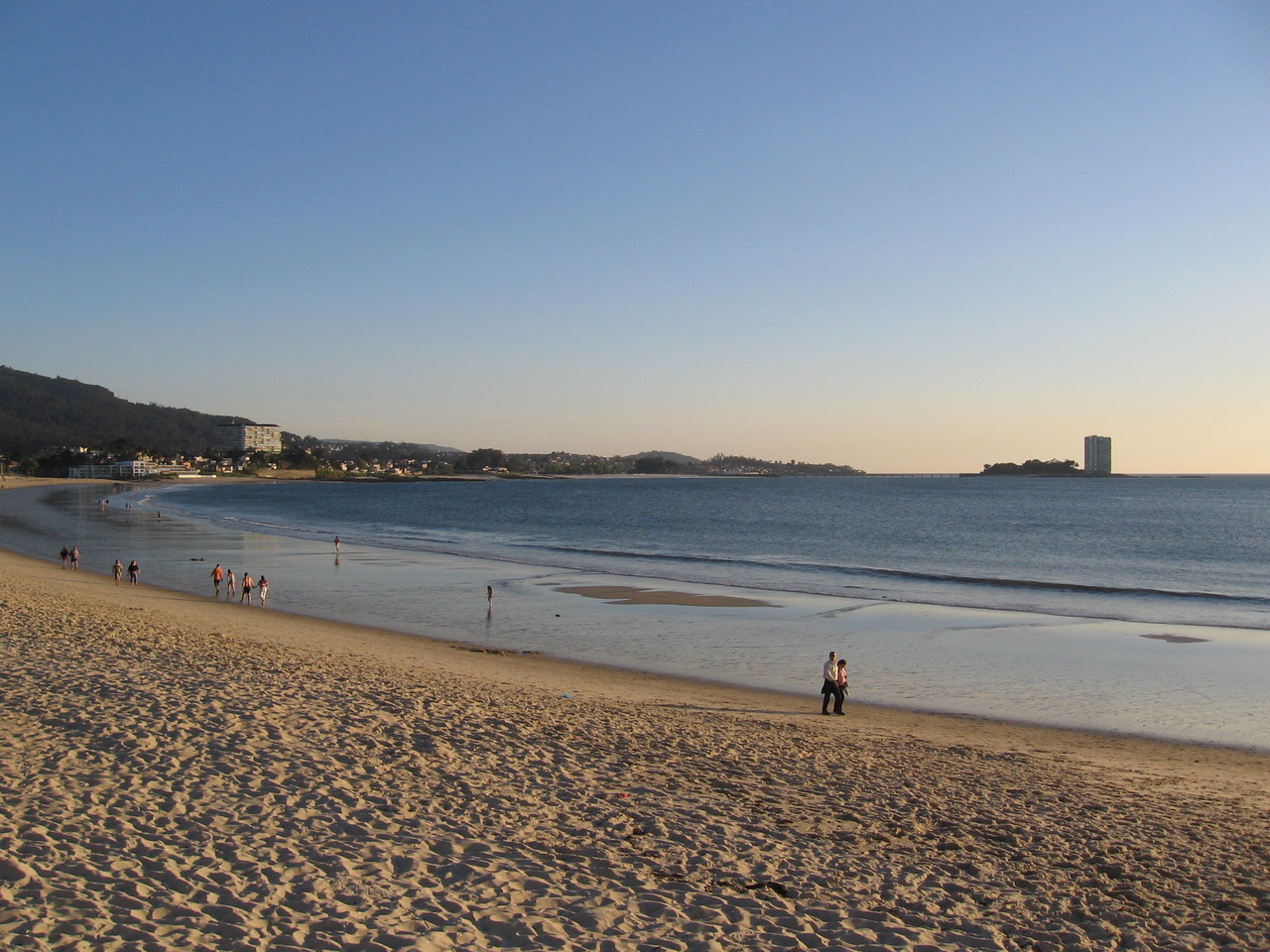
Ría de Vigo: Isla Toralla from Samil

- Water sports at the marinas in Baiona, Chapela, Moana, Cangas and Vigo.
- Two golf courses of eighteen holes and one of nine nearby.
- Parador "Conde de Gondomar" in Baiona: Located inside a medieval fortress, has a natural setting and convenient facilities.
- Pazo los Escudos in Vigo: converted Galician manor house that has walled gardens spread across the largest collection of heraldic Galician carvings.
- Pazo de Castrelos: manor house in Vigo.
- Castro de Vigo.

== See also ==
- Rande Bridge
