= María Soliño =

Galician born 1551, accused of and confessed to witchcraft

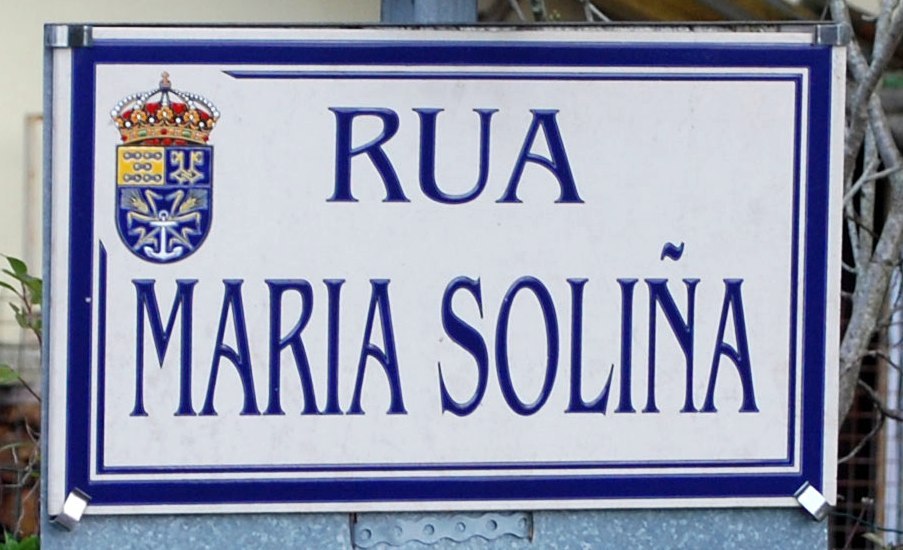
A street in the municipality of Narón named after María Soliño

María Soliño (1551- d. after 1617) was a Galician fisherwife and landowner. She is a famous victim of the Spanish Inquisition.

She was born in Cangas, Pontevedra in 1551. She married the fisherman Pedro Barba and had children. She also inherited several farms. The family became wealthy farmers and fishermen, which was considered provocative because of their social status. In 1617, the city was pillaged by Ottoman pirates, and her husband was killed, which caused her to become confused because of her sorrow. The pillage devastated the city and resulted in a witch trial.

A wealthy widow, she was accused of and confessed to practising witchcraft. It is believed that the actual reason was her wealth and the wish of the authorities to confiscate her property. She was tortured and imprisoned. She confessed guilty and sentenced to confiscation of her property as well as imprisonment and a physical punishment. She was described as old, weak and confused. It is not known when she died, but she may have died around the time of her sentencing, because it is not noted anywhere that she was actually subjected to her punishment. She has since become a symbol of the local people.

Her life has been portrayed in the 2020 film María Solinha (film) by Ignacio Vilar.
