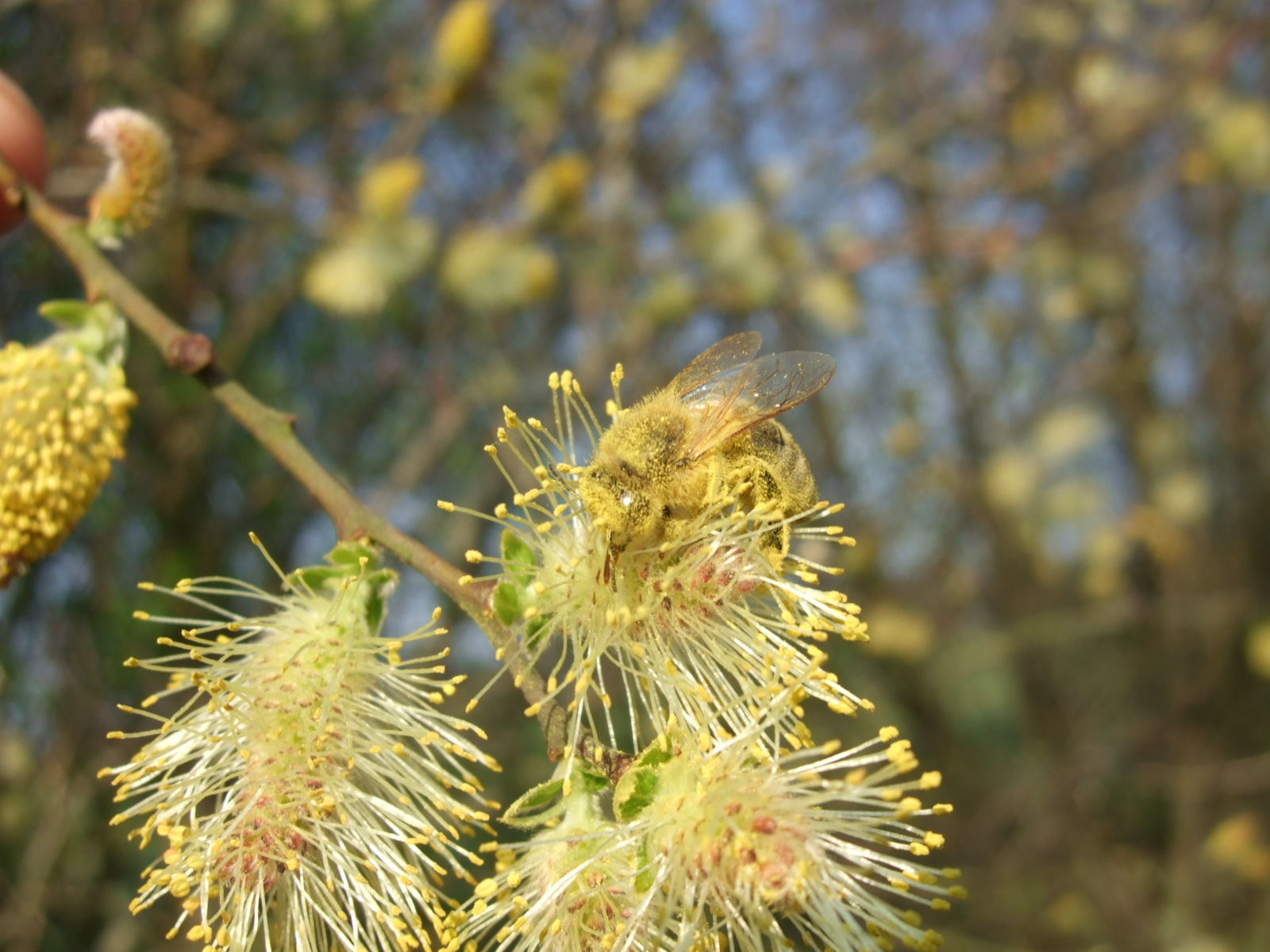

Conservation status
- Least Concern (IUCN 3.1)

Scientific classification
- Kingdom: Plantae
- Clade: Tracheophytes
- Clade: Angiosperms
- Clade: Eudicots
- Clade: Rosids
- Order: Malpighiales
- Family: Salicaceae
- Genus: Salix
- Species: S. atrocinerea

Binomial name
- Salix atrocinerea Brot.
- Distribution map

= Salix atrocinerea =

Species of willow

Salix atrocinerea, commonly called grey willow or large gray willow, is a species of willow. It is a bush or small tree up to 12 m (39 ft) tall. As a pioneer species of willow, it quickly colonizes poor soils.

== Distribution ==
The grey willow distribution is mostly Atlantic from Western Europe and North Africa to some Mediterranean islands. Naturally growing in Britain, France, Belgium, Netherlands, Spain, Portugal, Morocco, Algeria and Tunisia, it is very common in the Iberian Peninsula, and is also found in Corsica.

== Ecology ==
The species hybridizes readily with other species of willow and many hybrids have been identified. It flowers from January until March or April, depending on location, with the spread of seeds ripening from April to March.

The grey willow lives in freshly disturbed land, with preference for acidic soil, but this is a very hardy species and is even found on beaches near the sea and on islands. It grows in sandy or gravel shores of rivers, streams and ponds, meadows, valleys and hedgerows with some soil moisture, and is found from sea level to 2,000 m altitude, to the subalpine level. A forest of S. atrocinerea occupies the eastern end of Cortegada Island in permanently or temporarily waterlogged soils, and a mixed forest with Alnus glutinosa occupies the end west side.
