= Gilbert T. Sewall =

- Born: September 28, 1946 (age 79); Los Angeles, California, U.S.
- Education: University of California, Berkeley
- Occupations: Educator, author

Gilbert T. Sewall (born September 28, 1946) is an educator and author who writes on politics, education, and culture. He has been most recently a contributor to the Spectator World and American Conservative. His essays and book reviews cover arts and ideas, and the nature of civil society. A resident of New York City from 1978 to 2019, he lives in Santa Barbara, California.

== Early life and career ==
A native of Los Angeles, California, Sewall is a 1967 graduate of the University of California, Berkeley, and holds advanced degrees from Brown University in history and Columbia University in journalism.

From 1970 to 1978 Sewall was an instructor of history at Phillips Academy, Andover, where he taught American history and founded the school's economics and art history programs. He introduced water polo to the school as a team sport and was its first coach. Sewall was later education editor at Newsweek magazine where he won national prizes for articles on testing and textbooks.

Sewall has been on the adjunct faculties of New York University and Boston University, and was a research associate at the Institute of Politics and Philosophy of Education at Teachers College, Columbia University. Sewall has been a Fellow of the National Humanities Center and a Kenan Fellow at the American Academy in Rome, where he has also twice been a visiting scholar. From 1989, he was director of the American Textbook Council, an independent textbook and curriculum review organization, and an affiliated scholar with the Huntington Library in San Marino, California.

Sewall is a former member of the Publishing Research Quarterly and Phi Delta Kappan editorial boards. He was on the Committee on the Use of Volunteers in Schools of the National Research Council in 1990 and the Executive Committee of the National Council for History Standards from 1992 to 1994.

In the wake of Donald Trump's 2016 election as President of the United States, Sewall argued that the left, contrary to evidence, has launched "a concerted semantic campaign" to smear him by associating him with white supremacists.

== Writings and publications ==
Sewall is the author of Necessary Lessons: Decline and Renewal in American Schools (Free Press, 1983) and the co-author of After Hiroshima: The USA since 1945 (Longman, 3rd edition, 1992). He is editor of The Eighties: A Reader (Perseus, 1997). His articles have appeared in the New York Times, Wall Street Journal, Fortune, American Educator, and many other publications. His textbook studies include History Textbooks: A Standard and Guide (1994) and Islam in the Classroom: What the Textbooks Tell Us (2008). In 2010 he created the instructional website, Neoclassicism and America 1750-1900, a project of the National Endowment for the Humanities, revised in 2016.

== Selected articles ==
- "The Unremarkable Meghan Markle," Spectator World, June 14, 2022.
- “Twilight of the Humanities,” American Conservative, February 13, 2019.
- “Donald Trump and the Ghost of Christopher Lasch,” American Conservative, April 5, 2016.
- "The Migrant Conquest of Europe,"American Spectator, September 8, 2015.
- "A Counter-Cultural High School Summer Reading List," Wall Street Journal, May 29, 2015.
- “Heralded Report on the Humanities Falls Flat,” National Review, October 14, 2013.
- "Texas Did Not Really Re-Write History," Washington Post, April 7, 2010.
- "Teaching Islam: A Review," Middle East Quarterly, vol. 16, no. 1, Winter 2009.
- "Teaching Plutarch in the Age of Hollywood," American Educator, Fall 2007.
- "Lost in Action," American Educator, Summer 2000.
- "Religion Comes to School," Phi Delta Kappan, September 1999.
- "The Postmodern Schoolhouse," in Katharine Washburn and John Thornton, eds., Dumbing Down: The Strip-Mining of American Culture, W.W. Norton, 1996.
- "A Conflict of Visions: Multiculturalism and the Social Studies," in Robert Fullinwider, ed., Public Education in a Multicultural Society, Cambridge University Press, 1996.
- "Triumph of Textbook Trendiness," Wall Street Journal, March 1, 1994.
- "Goodbye Channel J -- and Good Riddance," New York Times, September 29, 1990.
- "‘Fearsome and Intimidating’ Texts," New York Times, November 18, 1987.
- "Vocational Education That Works," Fortune, September 19, 1983.
- "Against Anomie and Amnesia," Phi Delta Kappan, May 1982.
- "Journeys to the Interior of the Soul," Los Angeles Times, January 1, 1979.
- "The Broken Bond," New York Times, November 28, 1978.
- "Los Angeles: A City Committing Suicide," New York Times, May 31, 1977.
