= Cangas, Pontevedra =

Cangas Cangas do Morrazo
- Town and municipality
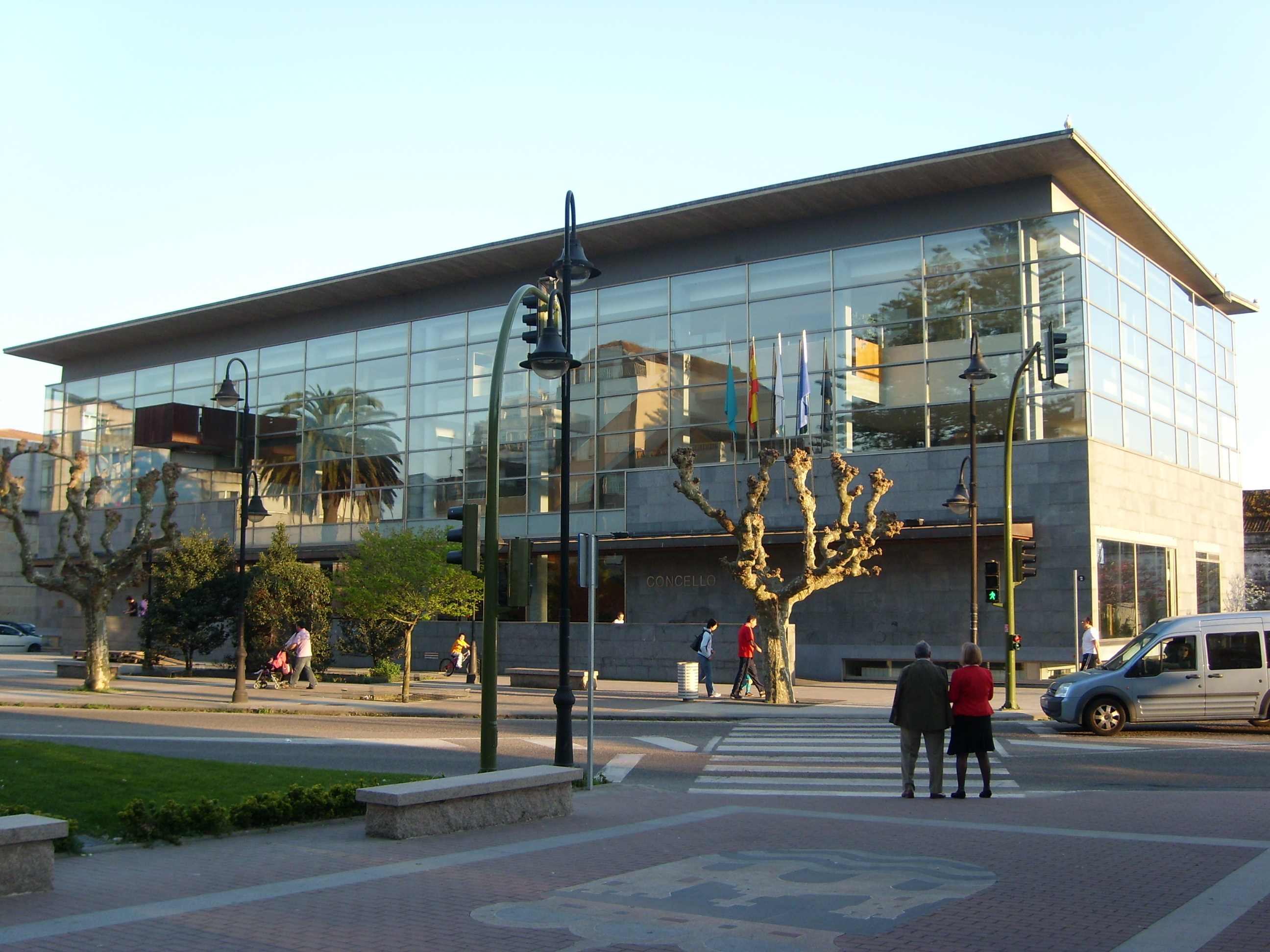

- Flag Coat of arms

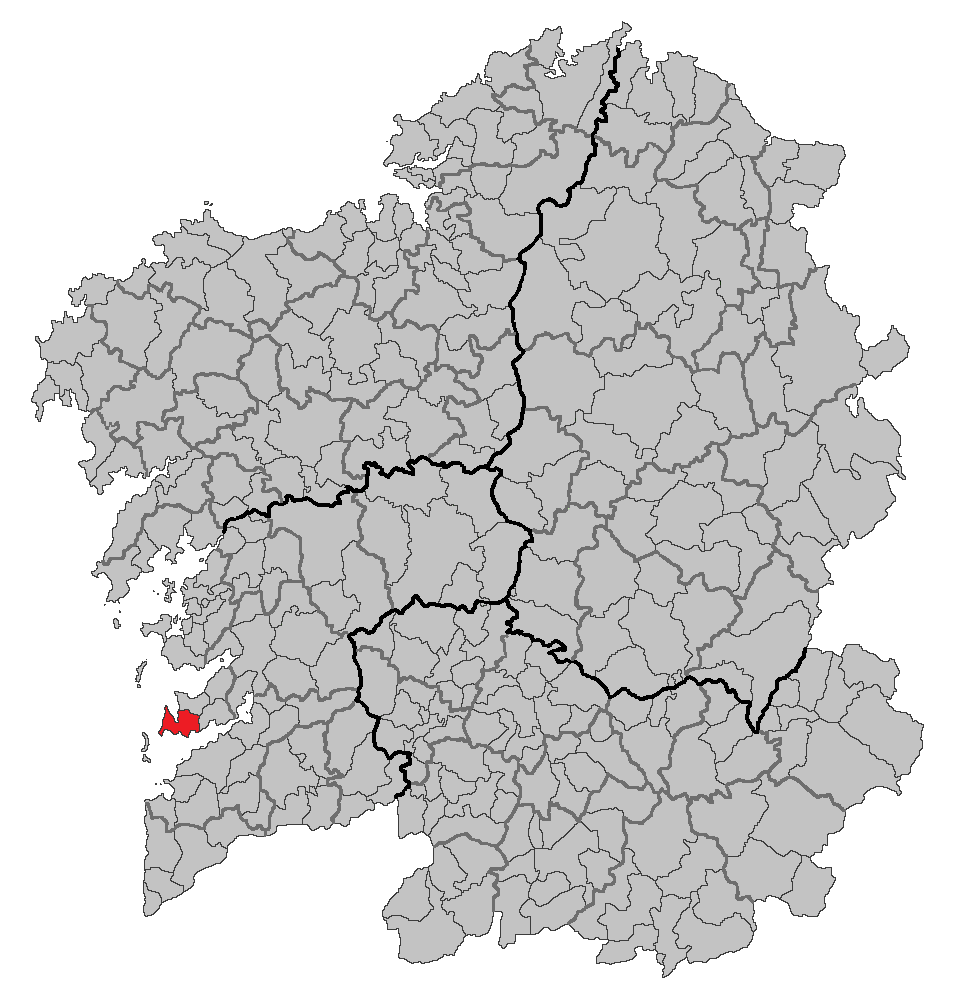
- Location of Cangas

- Location within Spain
- Coordinates: 42°15′51″N 8°46′55″W
- Country: Spain
- Autonomous community: Galicia
- Province: Pontevedra
- County: O Morrazo
- Founded: 1160
- Parishes: Aldán, Cangas, Coiro, Darbo, O Hío

Government
  - Type: Mayor–council
  - Body: Concello de Cangas
  - Mayor: Xosé Manuel Pazos (2015) (ACE)

Area
  - Total: 38.1 km^{2} (14.7 sq mi)
- Elevation: 9 m (30 ft)

Population (2025-01-01)
  - Total: 26,711
  - Density: 701/km^{2} (1,820/sq mi)
- Demonym(s): cangués, -esa, cangueiro, -ra (traditional).
- Time zone: UTC+1 (CET)
  - Summer (DST): UTC+2 (CEST)
- Postal code: 36940 - 36949
- Dialing code: 986
- Website: Official website

Cangas, also known as Cangas do Morrazo, is a seaside resort in southwestern Galicia, Spain. It is both a town and municipality in the province of Pontevedra. Its area is about 38,1 km^{2} and has a population of 26,698 inhabitants (2025).

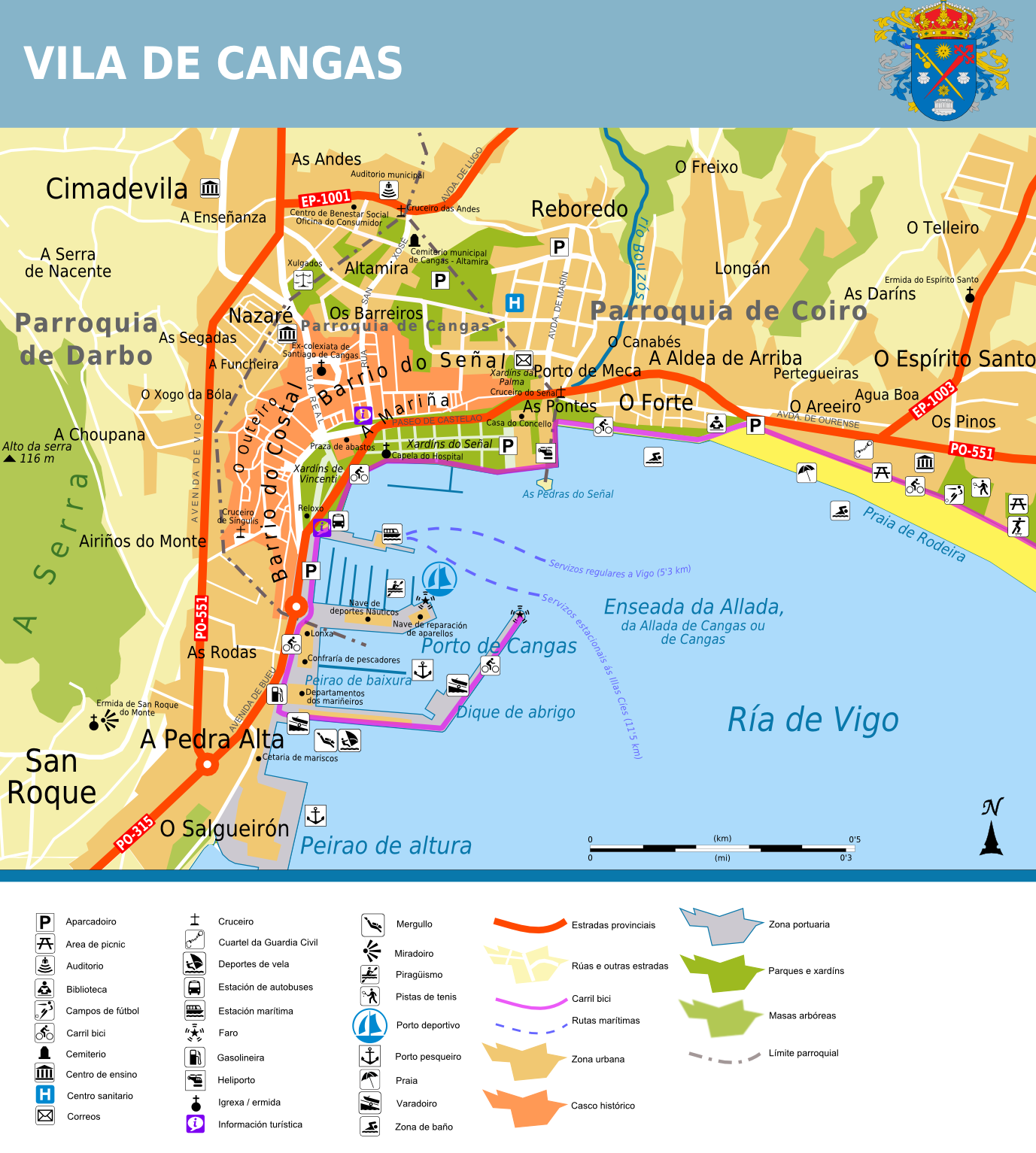
City map

== Government ==
The municipality of Cangas is administered by a mayor-council government, the Concello de Cangas, which meets in the Casa do Concello on Avenida Castelao. After the local elections of 2015 the municipality is governed by a coalition of Cangas Left Alternative (coalition of United Left and the FPG), the Galician Nationalist Bloc and Assembly for Unity (ASpUN).

Cangas Town Council
| Party | Councillors |
| PPdeG | 8 |
| ACE-SON | 4 |
| BNG | 4 |
| ASpUN | 3 |
| PSdeG-PSOE | 1 |
| Cangas Decide | 1 |

== Geography ==
=== Parishes ===
The municipality of Cangas is divided into five parishes:

- Aldán (San Cibrán)
- Cangas (Santiago)
- Coiro (San Salvador)
- Darbo (Santa María de Afuera)
- O Hío (San Andrés)

== Culture ==
=== Religious ===
Each parish has its own religious festival which honours the patron saint of the parish and smaller, minor festivals dedicated to the patron saints of local chapels. These celebrations both start and end with the firing of fireworks followed by a religious service.

Cangas

- Fiestas del Cristo del Consuelo, Last Sunday of August.

Darbo

- Fiestas de San Blas, 3 February
- Fiestas de Santa Marta, Last Saturday of July
- Fiestas de San Pedro, End of June
- Romería de San Roque, 3rd week of August
- Romería de Darbo, 6,7,8 and 9 September.

Coiro

- Fiestas del Espíritu Santo, Pentecost
- Fiestas de Santo Domingo, Start of August
- Fiestas de San Salvador, 6 & 7 August
- Fiestas de San Cosme, 26 September
- Fiestas do muiño, 1st Sunday of May.

Aldán

- Fiestas de San Amaro, Mid-January
- Fiestas de Santa Mariña, 18 July
- Fiestas del Carmen, Last weekend of July

Hío

- Fiestas del Cristo d e la Luz, 1st Sunday of July
- Fiestas de Santiago de Donón, 25 July
- Fiestas de San Lorenzo, 10 August
- Fiestas de San Andrés, 30 November
- Fiesta del Aguardiente, Weekend prior to the Fiestas del Cristo de la Luz.

== Twin towns ==
- (Portugal) Lajes do Pico (2003)

== Notable people ==
- María Soliño, alleged witch
- Xohán de Cangas, troubador
- Ángel Botello, painter, sculptor and graphic artist (1913-1986)
- Bernardino Graña, writer (1932-)
- Suso Soliño, handball player (1975-)
- Carlos Pérez, canoer (1979-)
- David Cal, canoer (1982-)
- Teresa Portela, canoer (1982-)
- Solange Pereira, athlete (1989-)

== See also ==
- List of municipalities in Pontevedra
