= Center for International Education =

The Center for International Education (CIE) is a program within the Department of Education Policy, Research and Administration (EPRA) in the School of Education at the University of Massachusetts-Amherst. CIE is closely integrated with the academic program in International education offered by EPRA. Center members consist of faculty, staff, current students, and graduates.

== Institutional profile ==
The Center for International Education is housed in the Educational Policy, Research and Administration Department of the School of Education at the University of Massachusetts-Amherst, since 1969. The Center offers graduate-level professional training, service, and research opportunities in the areas of international development education; non-formal and popular education and literacy; community development and empowerment; education in fragile states; education policy, planning and leadership; and internationalizing U.S. education.

== Core capabilities ==
Briefly summarized below are the kinds of service that CIE provides.

=== Project development and implementation ===
CIE has been a partner in implementing many large-scale formal and non-formal development education projects. In a typical program, CIE may provide one or more of the following services: long-term technical assistance; short-term consulting services; institutional capacity building; research and evaluation; staff training; and program planning.

=== Curriculum development ===
Many of CIE's projects involve developing curricula for adults in formal and non-formal educational contexts. CIE focuses on building local capacity to design, develop and evaluate curricula appropriate to local interests, needs and resources.

=== Research design and program evaluation ===
CIE and the associated faculty within the department have both extensive experience and capability in using a variety of approaches to research and evaluation. The Center is particularly well known for qualitative, participatory and practitioner-based approaches to research and evaluation. Faculty within the department are experts in measurement and assessment.

=== Training ===
Most programs fall under one of three training formats: degree training; customized short-term professional training for specific clientele; and the management and support of degree candidates at institutions of higher education.

=== Materials development, media, and technology ===
Some CIE techniques include: web-based learning and action, community drama, role plays, puppet shows, fotonovelas, radio programs for distance education, video and theater, electronic learning aids, and simple audiovisual tools.

== Directors ==
David R. Evans, 1969 - 2015

Joseph B. Berger, 2016 - 2017

Melinda Novack (Interim), 2017-2018

Ian Barron, 2018–present

== Current Faculty (2018-2019 Academic Year) ==
Ian Barron (D.Ed.Psy, Dundee, 2009)
Cristine Smith (Ed.D. UMass, 1997)
Jacqueline Mosselson (Ph.D., Columbia University, 2002)
Bjorn Harald Nordtveit (PhD, University of Maryland, 2005)
Ash Hartwell, (Ed.D. UMass, 1973)

Sharon F. Rallis (Ed.D., Harvard University, 1982)
John P. Comings (Ed.D., UMass, 1979)
Joseph Berger (Ph.D. Vanderbilt, 1997)

== Retired Faculty (2018-2019 Academic Year) ==
David R. Evans (Ph.D., Stanford, 1969)
Gretchen B. Rossman (Ph.D., University of Pennsylvania, 1983)

George E. Urch (Ph.D. Univ. of Michigan, 1967)
Robert J. Miltz (Ph.D. Stanford University, 1971)

Sharon F. Rallis (Ed.D., Harvard University, 1982)

== Degree Programs ==
The center for International Education is part of the School of Education at the University of Massachusetts. The School of Education offers the following two degrees:

1. Masters in Education (M.Ed.) in International Education
2. Doctorate (Ed.D.) in Education Policy and Leadership with a specialization in International Education.

== Projects ==
CIE has been awarded contracts on over 70 projects in 25 different countries in its history.

=== Current projects ===
==== Higher Education Project (HEP) ====
There are five major components of the HEP project:

- Building the capacity of the Ministry of Higher Education and developing quality control mechanisms at the university level
- Maintaining the existing Professional Development Centers in 11 Universities and creating two new ones
- Continuing to operate and build the sustainability of the Master's in Education at Kabul Education University
- Designing and preparing to start a bachelor's degree in Public Policy & Administration in four or five provincial Universities; *Designing and preparing a Master's in Public Policy and Administration to be offered at Kabul University
- Continuing to upgrade the capability of faculty members to teach English, Math & Science to pre-service teachers. (This component is done by Indiana University).

==== The Adult Transitions Longitudinal Study (ATLAS) ====
The Adult Transitions Longitudinal Study (ATLAS) documents the educational and economic outcomes of adult basic education students who participate in the New England ABE-to-College Transition Project in 2007 and 2008. The Project seeks to bridge the academic gaps between a GED and college-level work through direct instruction and counseling that addresses the social barriers experienced by non-traditional adult students.

==== Faculty Development in Foundations – Gaza ====
This project, by request of the Palestinian government, supports teacher education faculty professional development at Al-Azhar University – Gaza by sharing tools to incorporate more participatory techniques in their classrooms with a large number of students. Select faculty will be visiting the United States to observe other techniques. A follow-up visit to Gaza will support further professional development for Teacher Education faculty.

==== Global Horizons-USA ====
Global Horizon's primary mission is to promote a greater awareness of the world community in Massachusetts' schools K-12 by providing global and multicultural education curriculum resources and training to educators throughout the Western Massachusetts region.
