= Council on Islamic Education =

The Council on Islamic Education is a research institute and resource organization in Fountain Valley, California. The "Muslim academic scholars of religion, history, political science" at the Council seek to "support and strengthen American public education" by drawing upon "civic, ethical, and educational principles in Islam."

== Criticism ==
According to Diane Ravitch, major textbook publishers allow the Council to review material before publication, a practice which "may account for... their omission of anything that would enable students to understand conflicts between Islamic fundamentalism and Western liberalism"

Gilbert Sewall, former education editor of Newsweek and author of “Islam and the Textbooks” has criticized textbook publishers because they have “allowed Islamic organizations — notably the Council on Islamic Education — to strong-arm them and in effect act as censors.”

Critics have called the Council "a content gatekeeper with virtually unchecked power over publishers" and allege that "as a result, history textbooks accommodate Islam on terms that Islamists demand."

A report of the American Textbook Council calls the Council "an agent of contemporary censorship," and accuses it of being "in fact a political advocacy organization" that seeks to present an "Islamist" version of history.

== Reception ==
Others praise the Council for publishing "new materials have recently appeared to enable educators to teach more effectively."
