= Geology of the Canary Islands =

Geology of a Spanish archipelago in the Atlantic Ocean

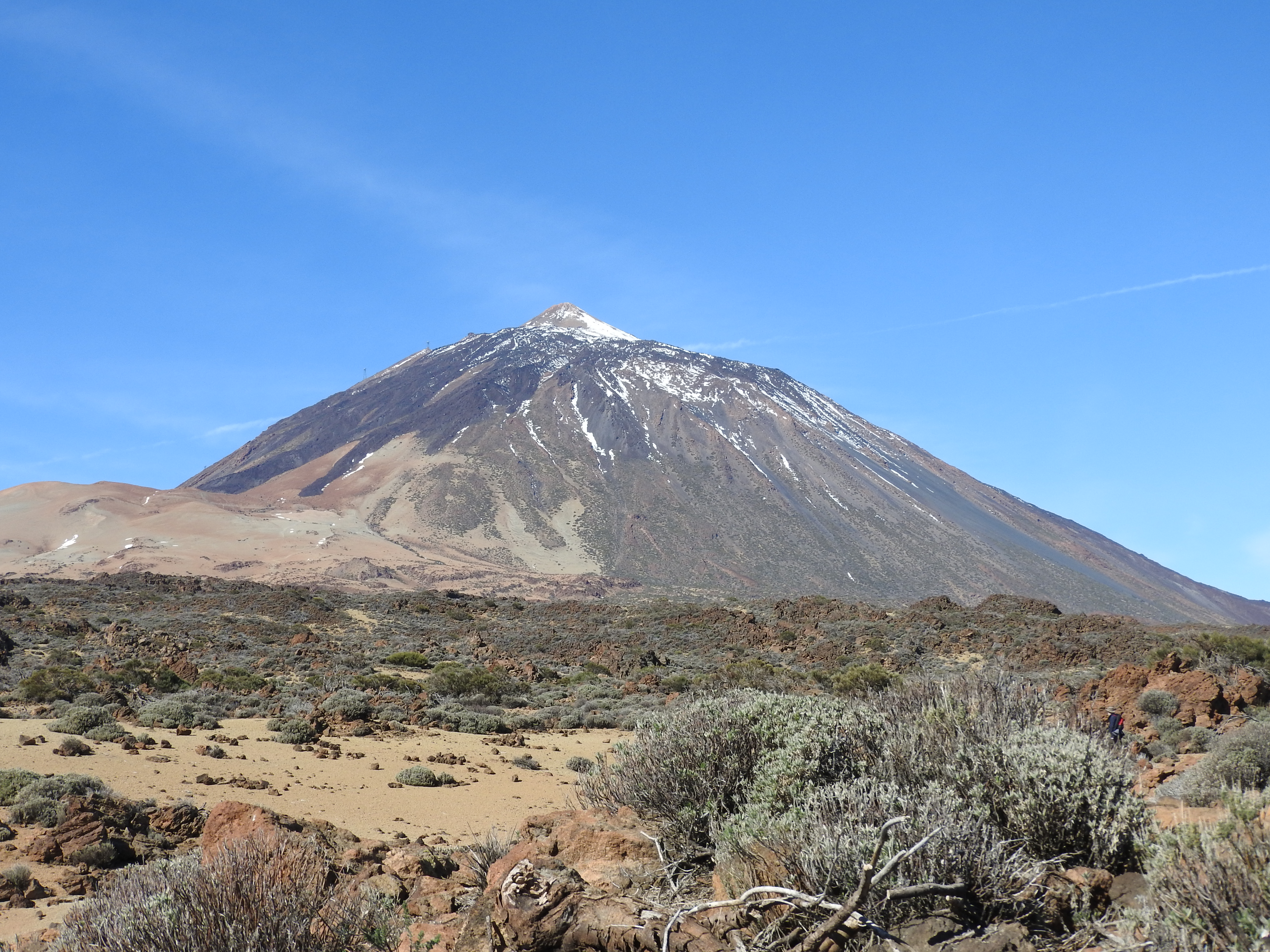
Teide stratovolcano on Tenerife

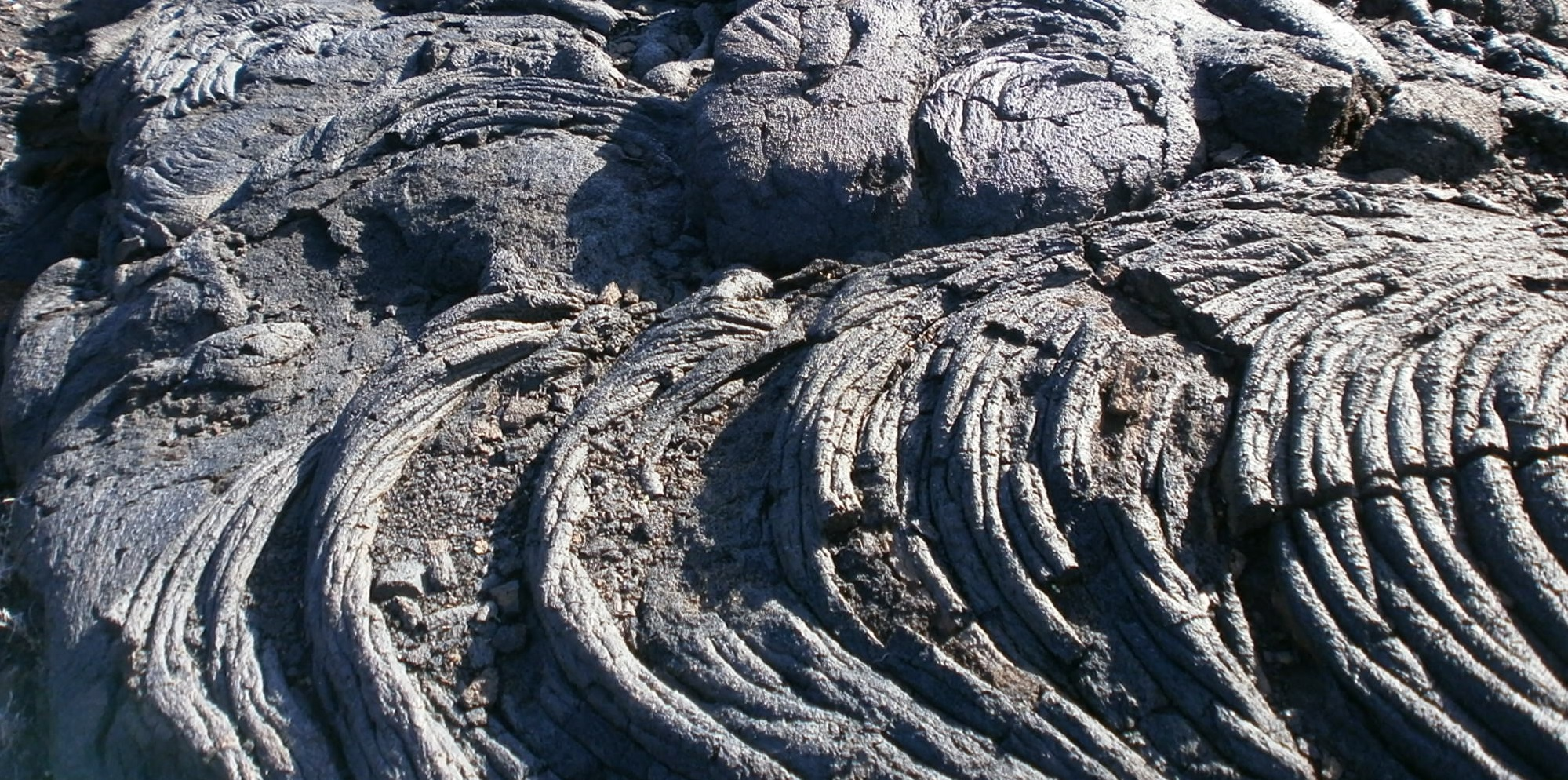
Pahoehoe lava flow on El Hierro

The geology of the Canary Islands is dominated by volcanoes and volcanic rock. The Canary Islands are a group of volcanic islands in the North Atlantic Ocean, near the coast of Northwest Africa. Geologically, the main islands are Lanzarote, Fuerteventura, Gran Canaria, Tenerife, La Gomera, La Palma, and El Hierro. There are also some minor islands and islets. The Canary Islands are on the African tectonic plate but they are far from the plate's edges; the islands are therefore an example of intraplate volcanism.

The Canary Islands, and some associated underwater volcanic mountains on the ocean floor, are in the Canary Volcanic Province. The current long period of volcanic activity in this province started about 70 million years ago. For many millions of years, all the volcanic eruptions in the province occurred on the ocean floor. In the last 20.2 million years, enough lava has accumulated at several of the underwater volcanic mountains to build them above sea level, forming the Canary Islands. The eastern islands emerged first, followed by each of the more westerly islands, in turn.

Volcanic activity has occurred during the Holocene Epoch (the last 11,700 years) on all of the main islands except La Gomera. The Canary Islands region is still volcanically active. The most recent volcanic eruption on land occurred in 2021 and the most recent underwater eruption was in 2011–2012.

== Islands ==
Canary Islands (top-left, ringed in red) in relation to Africa

Map of the Canary Islands showing land topography and ocean bathymetry

The Canary Islands are a 450 km-long (280 mi), east–west aligned archipelago of volcanic islands in the eastern part of the North Atlantic Ocean, 100–500 km (60–310 mi) off the coast of Northwest Africa. Geologically, there are seven main islands in the Canary Islands; from east to west they are Lanzarote, Fuerteventura, Gran Canaria, Tenerife, La Gomera, La Palma, and El Hierro. (Note: Since 2018, La Graciosa has been officially designated "la octava isla canaria habitada" (the eighth inhabited island of the Canary Islands), in effect the eighth "main island". This is only a political and social designation. La Graciosa continues to be a geologically minor island of the Canary Islands, associated with its much larger neighbour Lanzarote.)

Close to the coasts of the main islands, there are some minor islands and named islets including:

- near Lanzarote: the Chinijo Archipelago (La Graciosa, Alegranza, Montaña Clara, Roque del Este, and Roque del Oeste);
- near Fuerteventura: Lobos;
- near Tenerife: Roques de Anaga, Roque de Garachico;
- near Gran Canaria: Roque Melenara;
- near La Gomera: El Roquillo;
- near La Palma: Roque de Santo Domingo, Roque de las Tabaidas, Roque del Guincho;
- near El Hierro: Roques de Salmor;

There are also numerous unnamed islets.

The seven main Canary Islands originated as separate submarine seamount volcanoes on the ocean floor, which is 1,000–4,000 m (3,000–13,000 ft) deep in the Canarian region.

Lanzarote and Fuerteventura are separated by an 11 km-wide (7 mi), 40 m-deep (130 ft) ocean strait. Both islands are parts of a volcanic ridge called the Canary Ridge. These two islands have sometimes been a single island in the past when worldwide sea level was lower than its present level, for example during the Last Glacial Maximum about 20,000 years ago. The single island is sometimes referred to as Mahan.

The volume of volcanic rock that has built up the Canary Islands to thousands of metres above the ocean floor is about 124,600 km^{3} (29,900 cu mi); 96% of this lava is hidden below sea level and 4% (4,940 km^{3} (1,190 cu mi)) is above sea level. The western islands have more of their volume (7%) above sea level than do the eastern islands (2%).

== Regional setting ==
The Canary Islands are built upon one of the oldest regions of Earth's oceanic crust (175–150 Ma (Note: The oceanic crust under the Canary Islands formed between the Atlantic Ocean magnetozones S1 (175 Ma) and M21 (150 Ma))), part of the slow-moving African plate, in the continental rise section of Northwest Africa's passive continental margin.

The rocks under and in the Canary Islands are a record of multiple periods of volcanic activity:

1. Starting about 180 Ma (million years ago), the oceanic crust of the North Atlantic Ocean was formed; it consists of igneous rocks (plutonic rocks overlain by volcanic rocks) that were gradually covered by layers of sedimentary rocks. The igneous part of the oceanic crust was formed by seafloor spreading at the divergent plate boundary between the North American and African plates, as a result of the breakup of the supercontinent Pangaea; in the Canary Islands region, this occurred in the Jurassic Period. North America and Northwest Africa separated while the Atlantic Ocean grew between them. Although this volcanic activity formed the ocean floor on which the Canary Islands were later formed, this seafloor spreading type of volcanic activity was not involved in the formation of the islands.
2. Starting about 70 Ma, volcanic activity in the Canary Volcanic Province has occurred at numerous seamounts across the region now occupied by the Canary Islands as well as an area of the ocean floor up to 400 km (250 mi) north of the Canary Islands. The northernmost of this group of seamounts, Lars seamount (about 380 km (240 mi) north of Lanzarote), has been dated to 68 Ma. The seamounts are progressively younger southwestwards towards Lanzarote. Some seamounts developed into islands: first to emerge above sea level, at about 30 to 25 Ma, were the Selvagen Islands (200 km (120 mi) north of where the Canary Islands would later form). Then, each of the Canary Islands emerged as an island between 20.2 Ma and 1.1 Ma. Volcanic activity in the Canary Volcanic Province has continued to the present day.

== Island development stages ==
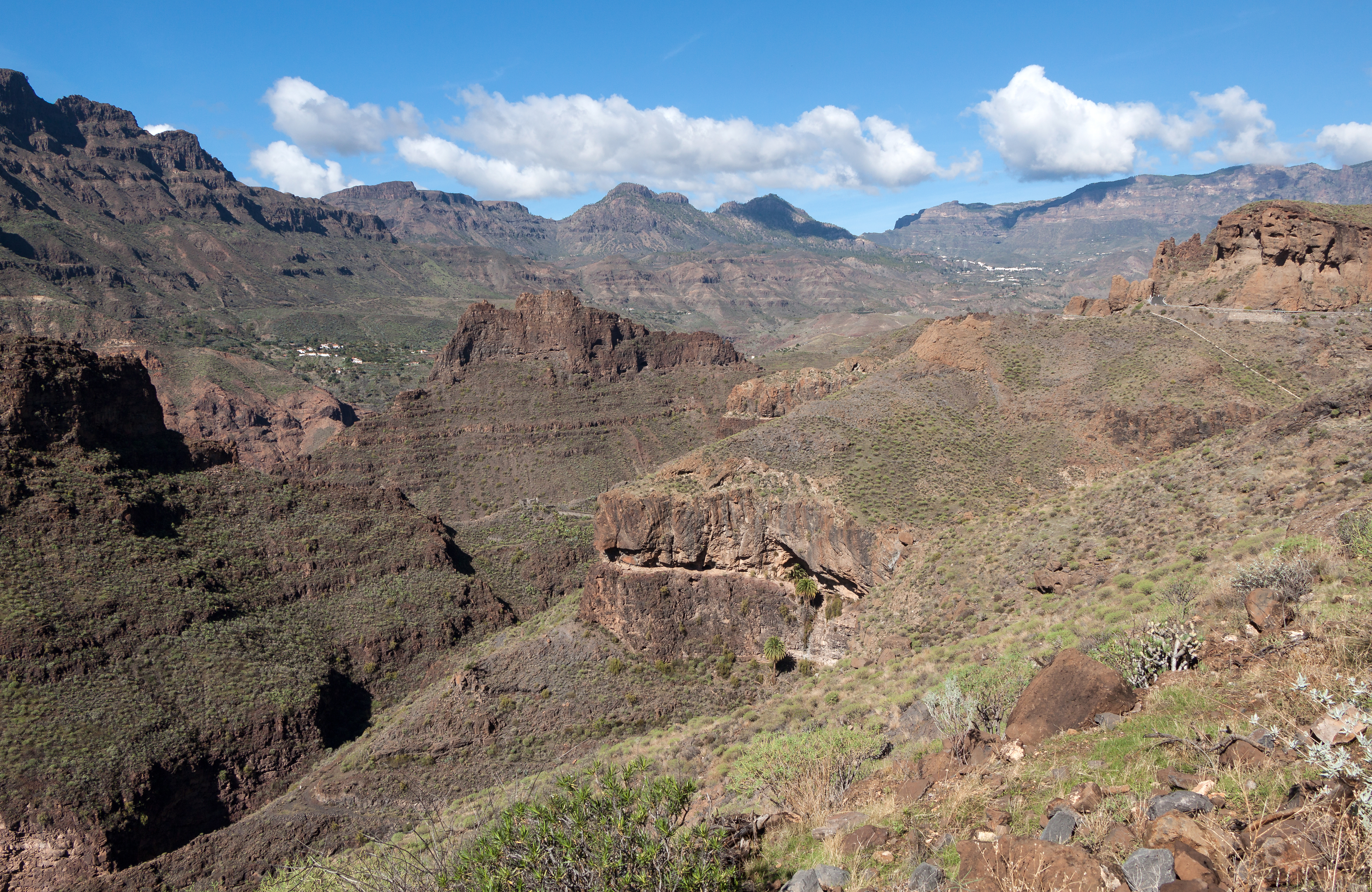
Erosion has cut ravines and canyons (known locally as barrancos) into the lava piles of some of the islands, as in this example at Barranco de Tirajana, Gran Canaria.

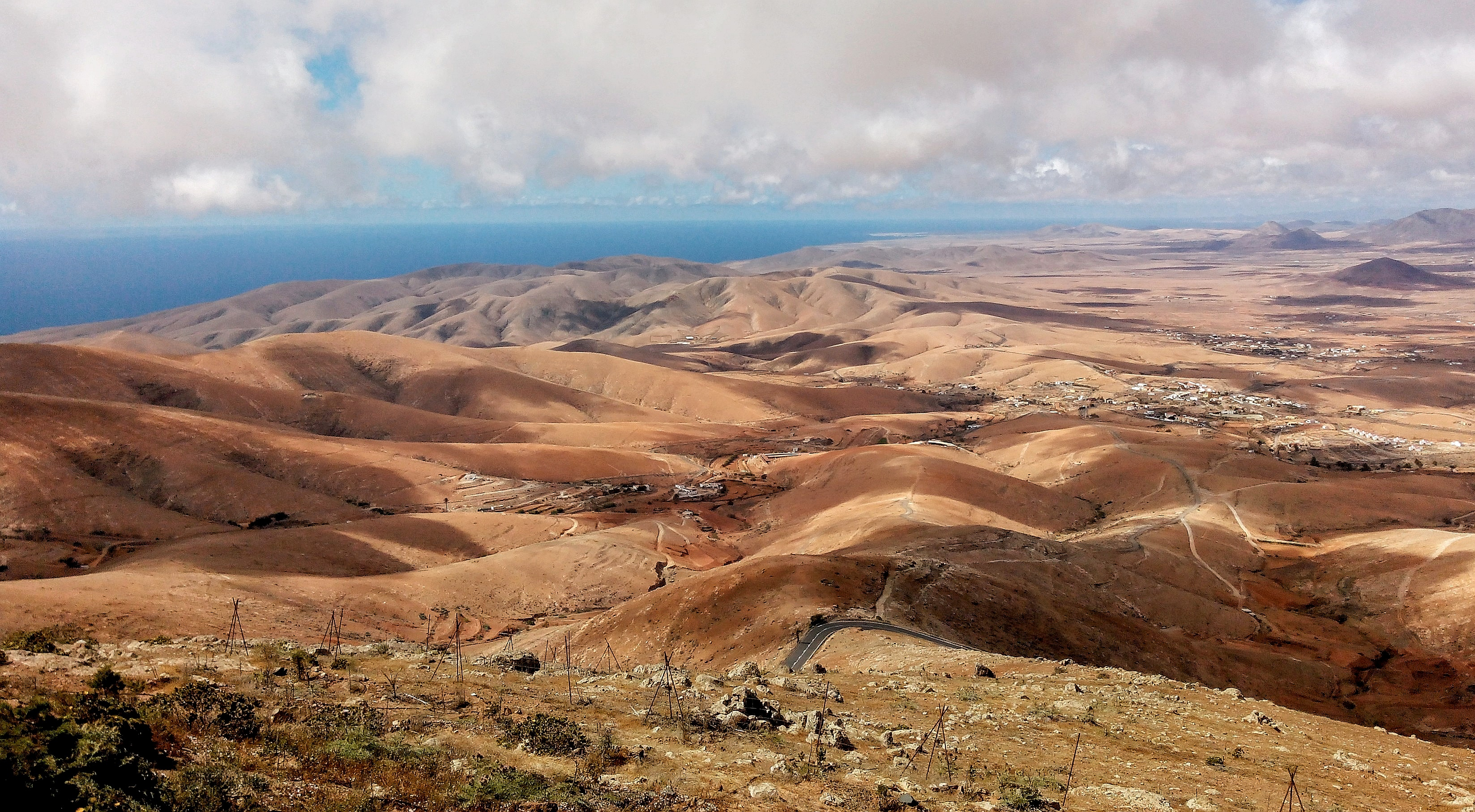
Subdued topography of Fuerteventura

The geological features of the Canary Islands place this island group at one end of a spectrum of types of intraplate volcanic oceanic islands that form in deep parts of the oceans, far from tectonic plate boundaries; the Hawaiian Islands are at the other end of this spectrum.

Intraplate volcanic oceanic islands follow a sequence of development stages. The sequence of stages was originally recognised, during the 1930s and 1940s, in the Hawaiian Islands, where eight stages were defined. In the Hawaiian volcanic island chain and some other volcanic island chains, some of the later stages occur due to subsidence of the island as seafloor spreading moves the island away from the focus of volcanic activity. In contrast, the Canary Islands have not undergone significant subsidence; therefore the sequence has been adapted in the Canary Islands to the following stages:

1. submarine (seamount) stage (El Hijo de Tenerife seamount)
2. shield-building stage (La Palma, El Hierro)
3. erosional stage (La Gomera)
4. post-erosional (or rejuvenation) stage (Tenerife, Gran Canaria, Lanzarote, Fuerteventura)

The Canary Islands differ from some other volcanic oceanic islands, such as the Hawaiian Islands: for example, the Canary Islands have stratovolcanoes, compression structures and a lack of significant subsidence.

The seven main Canary Islands originated as separate submarine seamount volcanoes on the floor of the Atlantic Ocean (although Tenerife and La Gomera are close enough to each other for their seamounts to overlap as they grew; the distance between Lanzarote and Fuerteventura was also small enough for some of their shield volcanoes to overlap as they grew, forming a single volcanic ridge). Each seamount, built up by the eruption of many lava flows, eventually became an island. Subaerial volcanic eruptions continued on each island.

The stage of development of each island is shown in its current topography. The five younger islands, in the western and central sections of the island group, are higher and more rugged. The two oldest, eastern islands of Fuerteventura and Lanzarote, where fissure eruptions have dominated in the rejuvenation stage, have more subdued topography with heights below 1,000 m (3,300 ft).

== Age ==
From about 70 Ma to 20.2 Ma, all the volcanic activity in the Canary Islands region occurred as underwater eruptions and the islands did not yet exist. Eventually, enough lava accumulated at particular locations to form each island of the Canary Islands archipelago. The age of the first underwater eruptions differs from island to island; for example, the first underwater eruptions at La Gomera were at more than 12 Ma but at La Palma they were at 4 Ma. Seamount stage rocks are not exposed on Lanzarote, Tenerife, Gran Canaria and El Hierro, which has hindered dating of the earliest underwater volcanic activity at these islands.

The age of the oldest subaerially-erupted lavas on each island decreases from east to west along the island chain: Lanzarote-Fuerteventura (20.2 Ma), (Note: 20.2 Ma for Fuerteventura; 15.6 Ma for Lanzarote.) Gran Canaria (14.6 Ma), Tenerife (11.9 Ma), La Gomera (9.4 Ma), La Palma (1.7 Ma) and El Hierro (1.1 Ma).

The age of the youngest sedimentary rocks under each of the islands also decreases from east to west along the island chain, showing that the east-to-west age progression also applies to the start of seamount formation on the ocean floor.

== Geological map ==
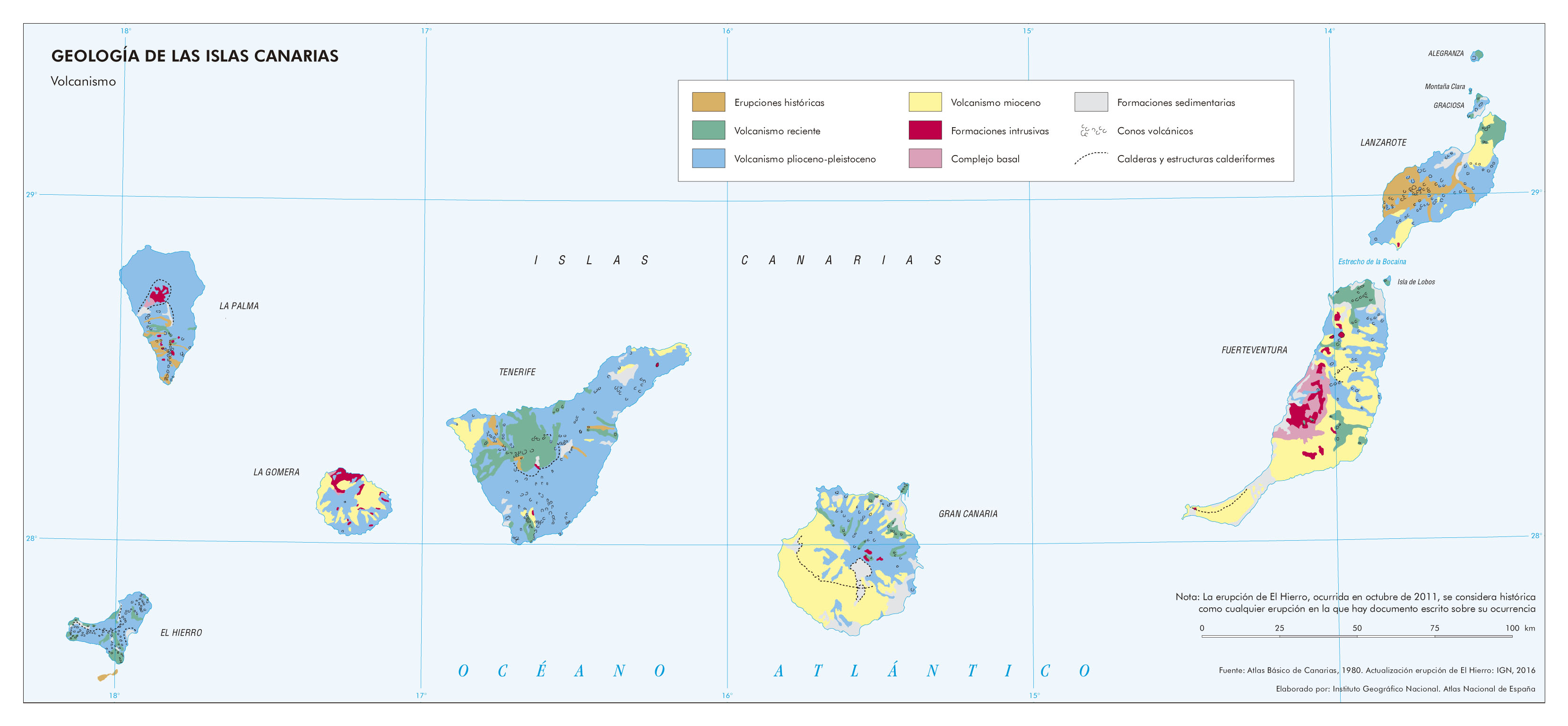
Geological map of the Canary Islands by Instituto Geográfico Nacional (Spain), 2016 (text in Spanish)

Translation of Spanish text in the map:

- Geología de las islas Canarias = Geology of the Canary Islands
- Volcanismo = Volcanism
- Océano Atlántico = Atlantic Ocean
- Erupciones históricas = Historical eruptions
- Volcanismo reciente = Recent volcanism
- Volcanismo plioceno-pleistoceno = Pliocene-Pleistocene volcanism
- Volcanismo mioceno = Miocene volcanism
- Formaciones intrusivas = Intrusive formations
- Complejo basal = Basal complex
- Formaciones sedimentarias = Sedimentary formations
- Conos volcánicos = Volcanic cones
- Calderas y estructuras calderiformes = Calderas and calderiform structures
- Nota: La erupción de El Hierro ocurrida en octubre de 2011, se considera histórica como cualquier erupción en la que hay documento escrito sobre su ocurrencia = Note: The eruption of El Hierro that occurred in October 2011 is considered historical, as is any eruption of which there is a written document about its occurrence
- Fuente = Source
- Actualización erupción de El Hierro = El Hierro eruption update

== Rock types ==
=== Igneous rocks ===
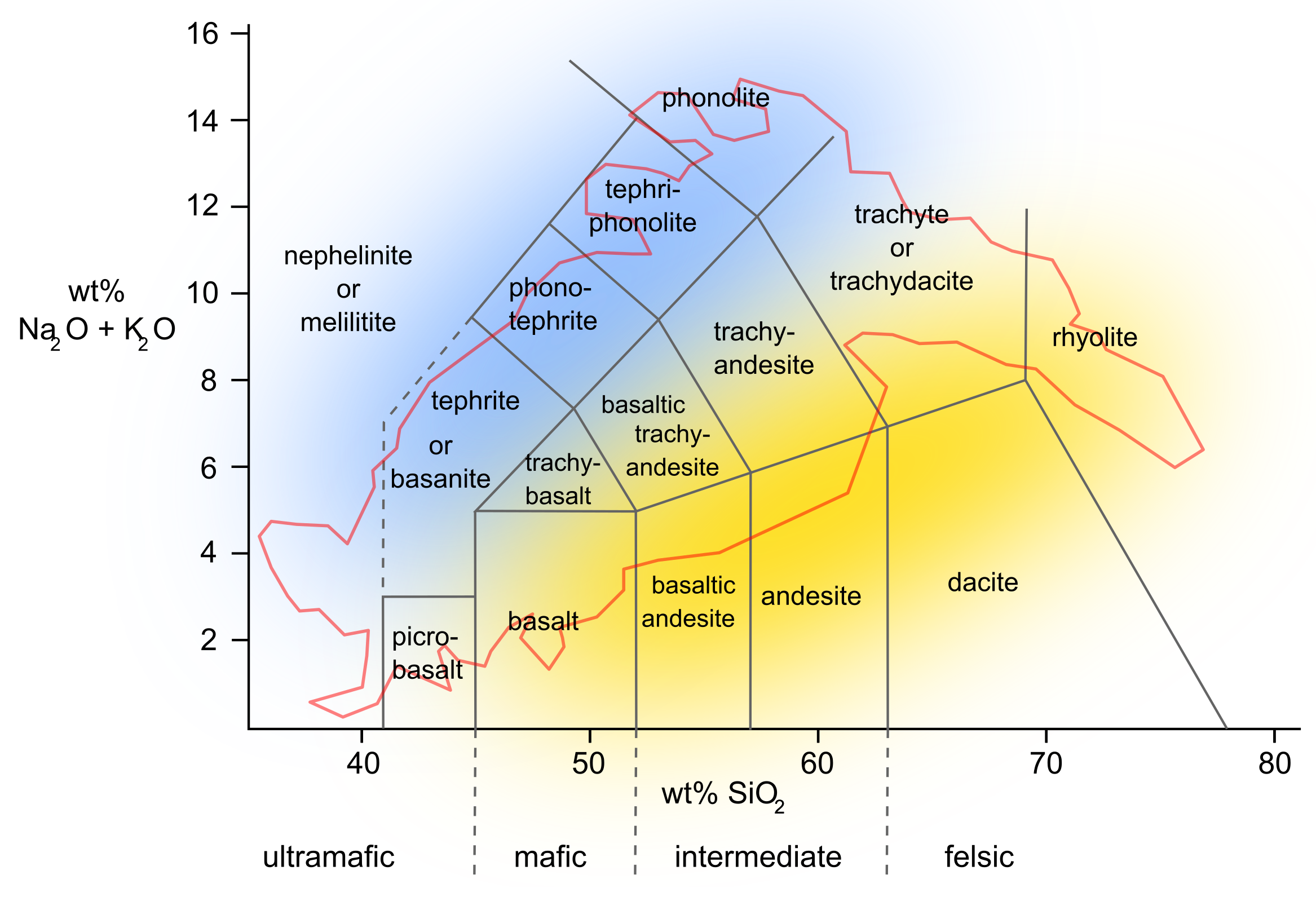
TAS diagram of volcanic rocks of the Canary Islands. The chemical compositions of 1,869 rocks are in the area outlined in red. The blue area roughly corresponds to alkaline volcanic rocks. The yellow area roughly corresponds to sub-alkaline volcanic rocks.

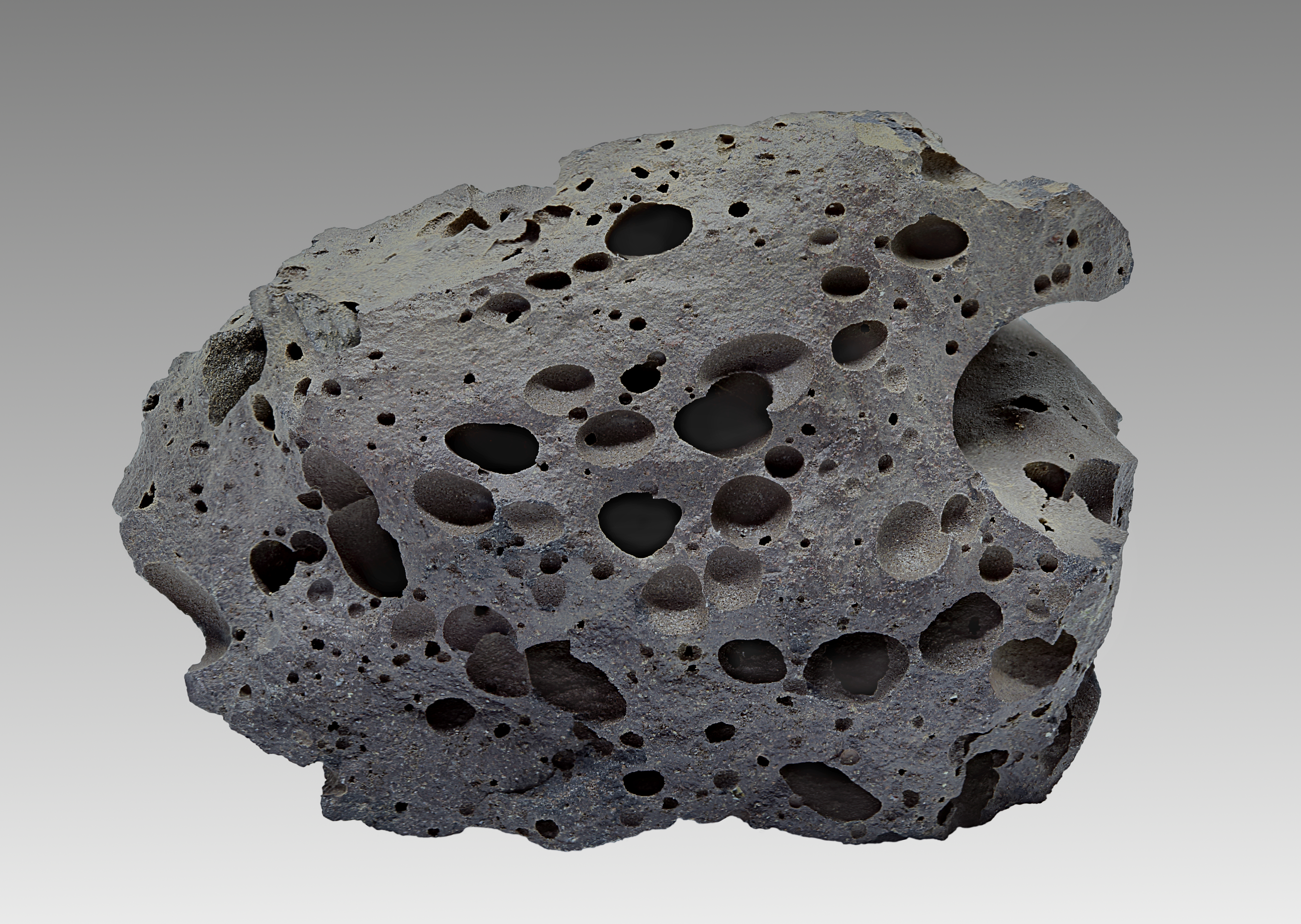
Basaltic lava rock with holes (vesicles) where bubbles of gas were trapped within the lava when it was molten, from Lanzarote (length: 6 cm (2.4 in))

In the Canary Islands, igneous rocks of the alkaline magma series are common, while rocks of the sub-alkaline tholeiitic magma series are rare.

Volcanic rock types found on the Canary Islands are typical of oceanic islands. The volcanic rocks include alkali basalts, basanites, phonolites, trachytes, nephelinites, trachyandesites, tephrites and rhyolites. There are lava flows as well as deposits of pyroclastic material, such as tuff (made of volcanic ash or lapilli).

Outcrops of plutonic rocks (for example, syenites, gabbros and pyroxenites) that formed deep below the surface occur on Fuerteventura, La Gomera and La Palma.

Apart from some islands of Cape Verde (another volcanic island group in the Atlantic Ocean, about 1,400 km (870 mi) south-west of the Canary Islands), Fuerteventura is the only oceanic island known to have outcrops of carbonatite. On Fuerteventura, the carbonatite occurs as igneous intrusions.

=== Sedimentary rocks ===
Minor deposits of sedimentary rocks outcrop on the Canary Islands. They consist of calcrete/caliche, sandstone, conglomerate, aeolianite, and limestone.

=== Metamorphic rocks ===
Some metamorphic rocks are exposed on the Canary Islands.

The structurally deepest parts (the basal complexes) of Fuerteventura, La Gomera, and La Palma include hydrothermally metamorphosed oceanic crust rocks and lower seamount rocks that were altered from their original igneous and sedimentary rock types and folded before the three islands emerged. These rocks were subjected to pressures and temperatures corresponding to zeolite, prehnite-pumpellyite and greenschist facies. These metamorphic rocks have been uplifted and then exposed by erosion of younger overlying rocks.

There are small amounts of migmatite and hornfels that outcrop in contact aureoles bordering igneous intrusions in the Basal Complex of Fuerteventura.

Some sedimentary rocks of the uppermost oceanic crust under Lanzarote were thermally metamorphosed by heat from intrusion of magma into the sedimentary rocks. The original sandstones and shales were transformed into quartzite and slate respectively. Later volcanic eruptions have transported fragments of these quartzites and slates onto the island's surface as xenoliths within basaltic lava.

== Origins of volcanism ==
Several hypotheses have been proposed to explain the volcanism of the Canary Islands. Two hypotheses have received the most attention from geologists:

1. The volcanism is related to crustal fractures extending from the Atlas Mountains of Morocco.
2. The volcanism is caused by the African plate moving slowly over a hotspot in Earth's mantle.

A hotspot (the Canary hotspot) is the explanation accepted by most geologists who have studied the Canary Islands in the last few decades. A relatively hot mantle plume associated with this hotspot is thought to be rising through the mantle under La Palma and El Hierro.

Evidence in favour of a hotspot origin for Canarian volcanism includes the age progression in the arcuate Canary Volcanic Province occurring in the same direction and at the same rate as in the neighbouring arcuate Madeira Volcanic Province, about 450 km (280 mi) farther north. This is consistent with the African plate rotating anticlockwise at about 12 mm (0.47 in) per year. Also, seismic tomography has revealed the existence of a region of hot rock extending from the surface, down through the oceanic lithosphere to a depth of at least 1,000 km (620 mi) in the upper mantle. Another line of evidence is the east-to-west decrease in age of the youngest sedimentary rocks under each island.

== Volcanic eruption distribution ==
According to the Smithsonian Institution's Global Volcanism Program, as of 2023, seventy-five confirmed volcanic eruptions have occurred in the Canary Islands in the Holocene Epoch (the last 11,700 years of Earth's geological history). Fifteen of these eruptions have occurred since 1490; contemporary written reports exist for these eruptions and they are known as the historical eruptions of the Canary Islands. In the last 500 years, a volcanic eruption has occurred somewhere in the island chain, on average, every 30 to 35 years. For each island, however, the time gap or repose time between historical eruptions has been highly variable (for example, 26 to 237 years for La Palma; 1 to 212 years for Tenerife). This large variability is one of the reasons why reliable prediction of future eruptions at the volcanoes of the Canary Islands is unlikely.

An eruption on Tenerife, about 2,000 years ago, is the largest Canarian eruption of the Holocene Epoch. The largest volume and longest duration historical eruption in the Canary Islands occurred in the early 18th century on Lanzarote.

The following table shows the distribution of volcanic eruptions during the last 11,700 years in the Canary Islands:

Holocene and historical volcanic eruptions in the Canary Islands (according to the Smithsonian Institution's Global Volcanism Program, as of 2023)
Island	Holocene (last 11,700 years)	Historical (since 1490)	Historical eruption dates	Notes	Ref.
Lanzarote	4	2	1730–1736, 1824	The 1730–1736 eruption is the largest historical eruption in the Canary Islands	
Fuerteventura	0	0	——	No dated confirmed Holocene eruptions, but the freshness of some lavas and some volcanic landforms suggests that they may have been formed in the Holocene.	
Gran Canaria	11	0	——		
Tenerife	42	5	1492, 1704–1705, 1706, 1798, 1909		
La Gomera	0	0	——		
La Palma	14	7	1585, 1646, 1677–1678, 1712, 1949, 1971, 2021		
El Hierro	4	1	2011–2012		

=== Tenerife and La Palma comparison ===
During the last 10,000 years, Tenerife and La Palma have been the two most volcanically active Canary islands. The bar chart compares the number of confirmed volcanic eruptions (vertical y-axis) at different stages during this time span (horizontal x-axis).

- Tenerife
- La Palma

== Lanzarote ==
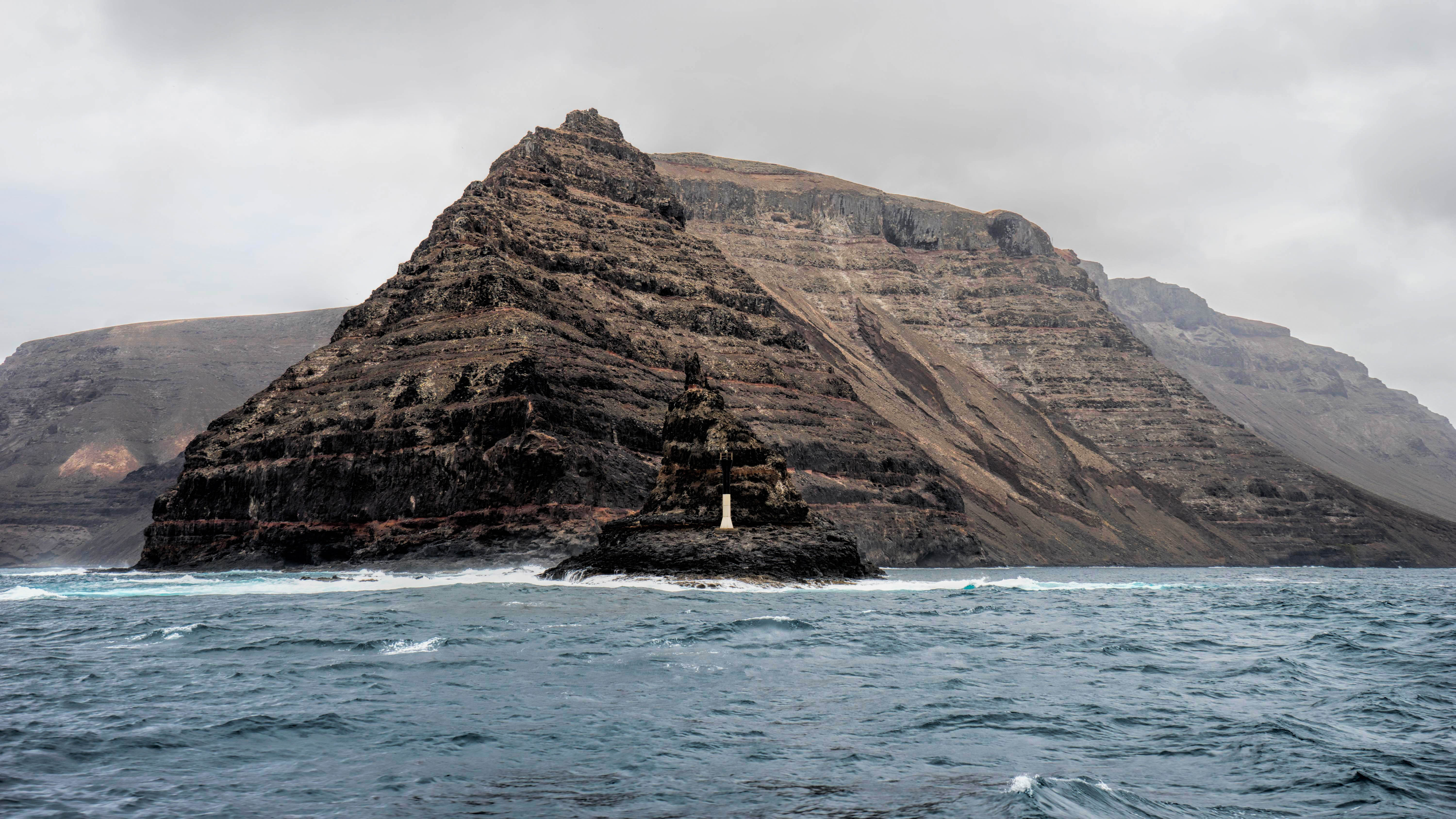
Remains of the Famara shield volcano's pile of lava flows at Punta Fariones, the northern tip of Lanzarote (cliff height: 200–300 m (660–980 ft))

Volcanic activity at Lanzarote started during the Oligocene Epoch at 28 Ma. For about the first 12 million years, the lava pile of a submarine seamount built up from the 2,500 m-deep (8,200 ft) ocean floor. Then, in the Miocene Epoch, from 15.6 Ma to 12 Ma, the Los Ajaches subaerial shield volcano grew as an island on top of the seamount, in an area corresponding to present-day southern Lanzarote. Between 10.2 Ma and 3.8 Ma, volcanic activity was focussed about 35 km (22 mi) to the northeast, forming a second shield volcanic island called Famara. Between Los Ajaches and Famara volcanoes, a central volcanic edifice was also active from 6.6 to 6.1 Ma. The edifices gradually merged to form a single island, Lanzarote, at about 4 Ma. From 3.9 Ma to 2.7 Ma, volcanic activity paused and the island was eroded. Today, although the lavas of Los Ajaches volcano are now mostly covered by calcrete, the eroded remains of the two shield volcanoes are preserved in southern and northern Lanzarote respectively, with small outcrops of the central edifice occurring between them.

A terrestrial sediment layer, around 1–4.2 metres (3 ft 3 in – 13 ft 9 in) thick, between basalt layers on the Famara massif in northeast Lanzarote, dates to the early Pliocene Epoch around 4 Ma. The terrestrial sediment layer consists of calcarenite, clay-rich marl, and breccia. These sediment layers were formed on a sandy flat plain, when the island was likely around 25–100 km^{2} (9.7–38.6 sq mi) in area. It preserves fossils of insect eggs, land snails, snake vertebrae, as well as tortoise and bird eggshells. Most of the bird eggs are large and have been attributed to ratites, while they were formerly attributed to two forms, one ostrich-like and one elephant bird-like, today they are considered to have likely been produced by a single species of ostrich. Lanzarote has never been connected to the African mainland, so the animals are thought to have reached the island by oceanic dispersal.

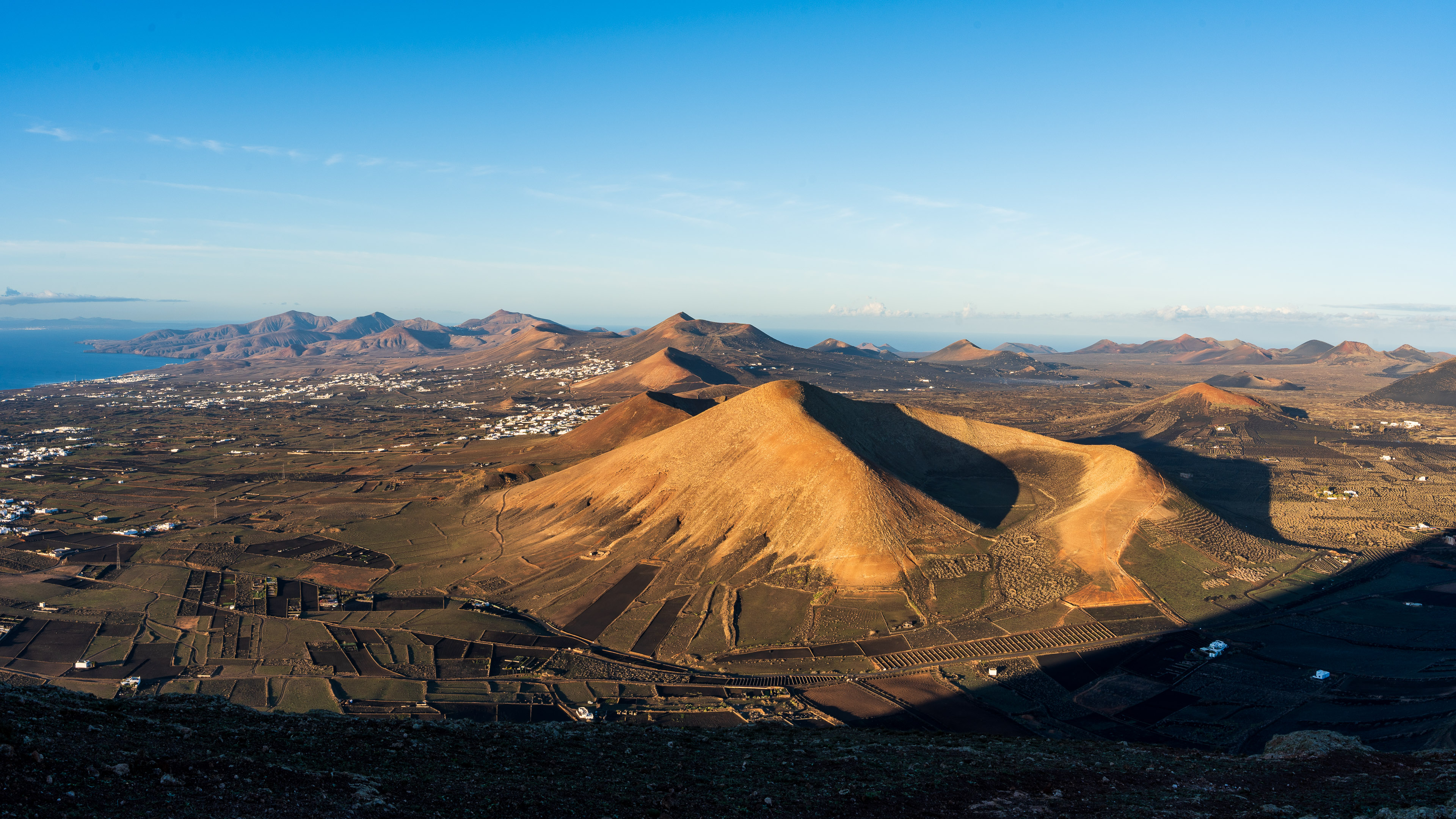
Rejuvenation stage volcanoes on Lanzarote aligned NE-SW with a view of Los Ajaches in the background

At about 2.7 Ma, in the late Pliocene Epoch, the rejuvenation stage began. It produced much less lava than the earlier shield stage, mainly at the Montaña Roja and Montaña Bermeja volcanoes in southern Lanzarote. Then, throughout the subsequent Pleistocene and Holocene epochs, the rejuvenation volcanism has continued and has been dominated by strombolian-style eruptions of lava from sets of volcanic cones aligned along numerous northeast–southwest fissures in the central part of Lanzarote. Geologically recent examples of Lanzarote's rejuvenation stage volcanism include eruptions at Montaña Corona (about 21,000 years ago), Timanfaya (1730–1736) and Tao/Nuevo del Fuego/Tinguatón (1824).

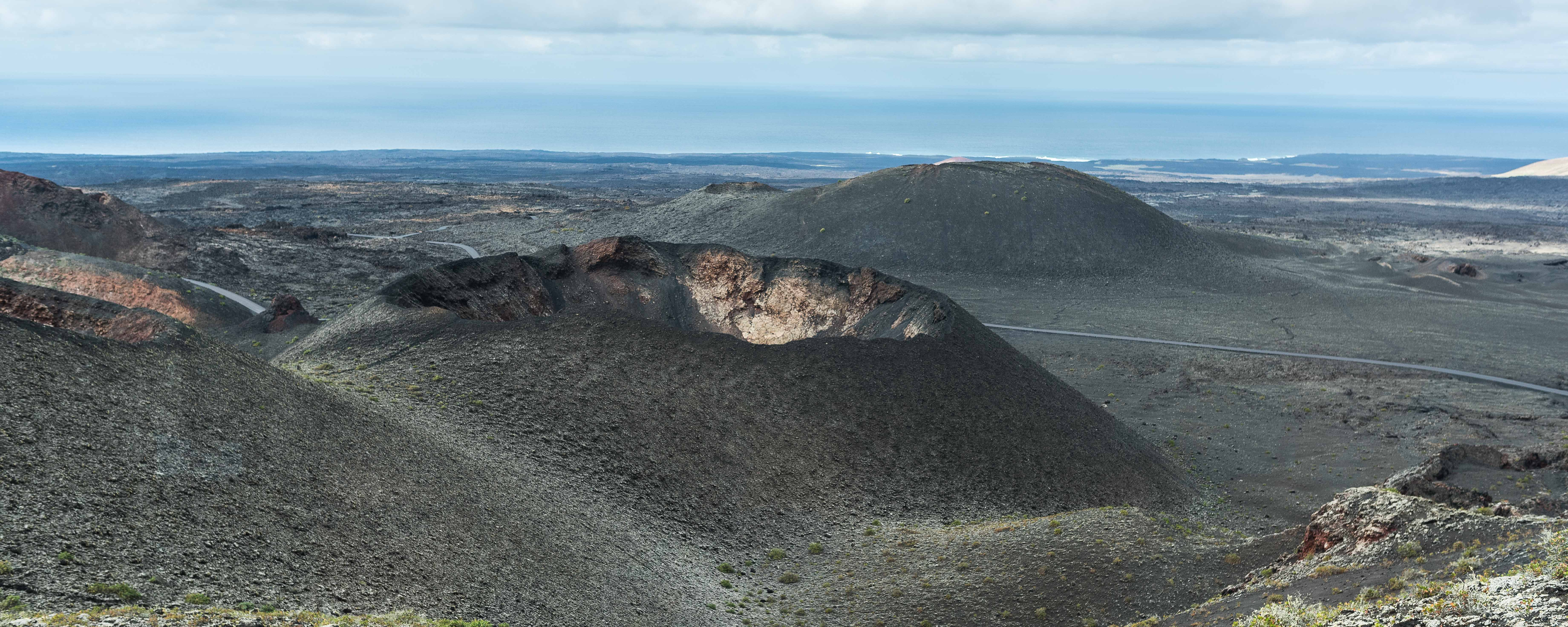
Timanfaya, Lanzarote

The Timanfaya eruption (1730–1736) erupted more than one billion cubic metres (1 km^{3} (0.24 cu mi)) of lava, and a large volume of pyroclastic tephra, from more than 30 volcanic vents along a 14 km-long (9 mi) fissure in western Lanzarote. The Timanfaya lava flows cover one quarter of the island (an area of about 225 km^{2} (87 sq mi)) with some of the flows reaching about 50 m (160 ft) in thickness. The Timanfaya eruption is the largest historical eruption in the Canary Islands, and the third largest subaerial fissure eruption of basaltic lava on Earth in the last 1,100 years.

Almost all the volcanic rocks of Lanzarote are basaltic.

== Fuerteventura ==
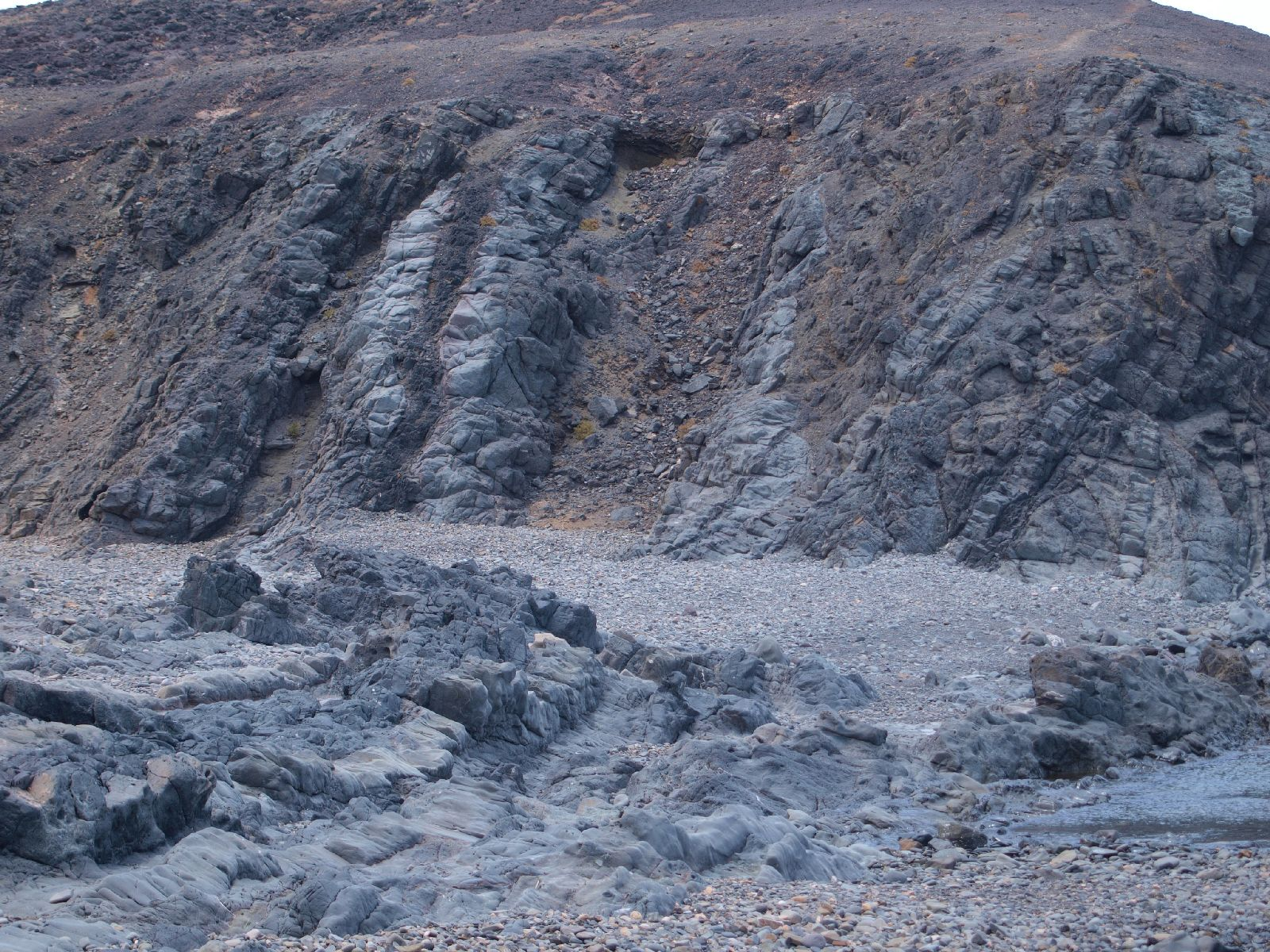
Basal Complex near Ajuy, Fuerteventura

Fuerteventura is situated on Mesozoic oceanic crust, about 70 km (40 mi) from the edge of the African continental shelf and about 100 km (60 mi) from the African mainland, making it the Canarian island closest to Africa.

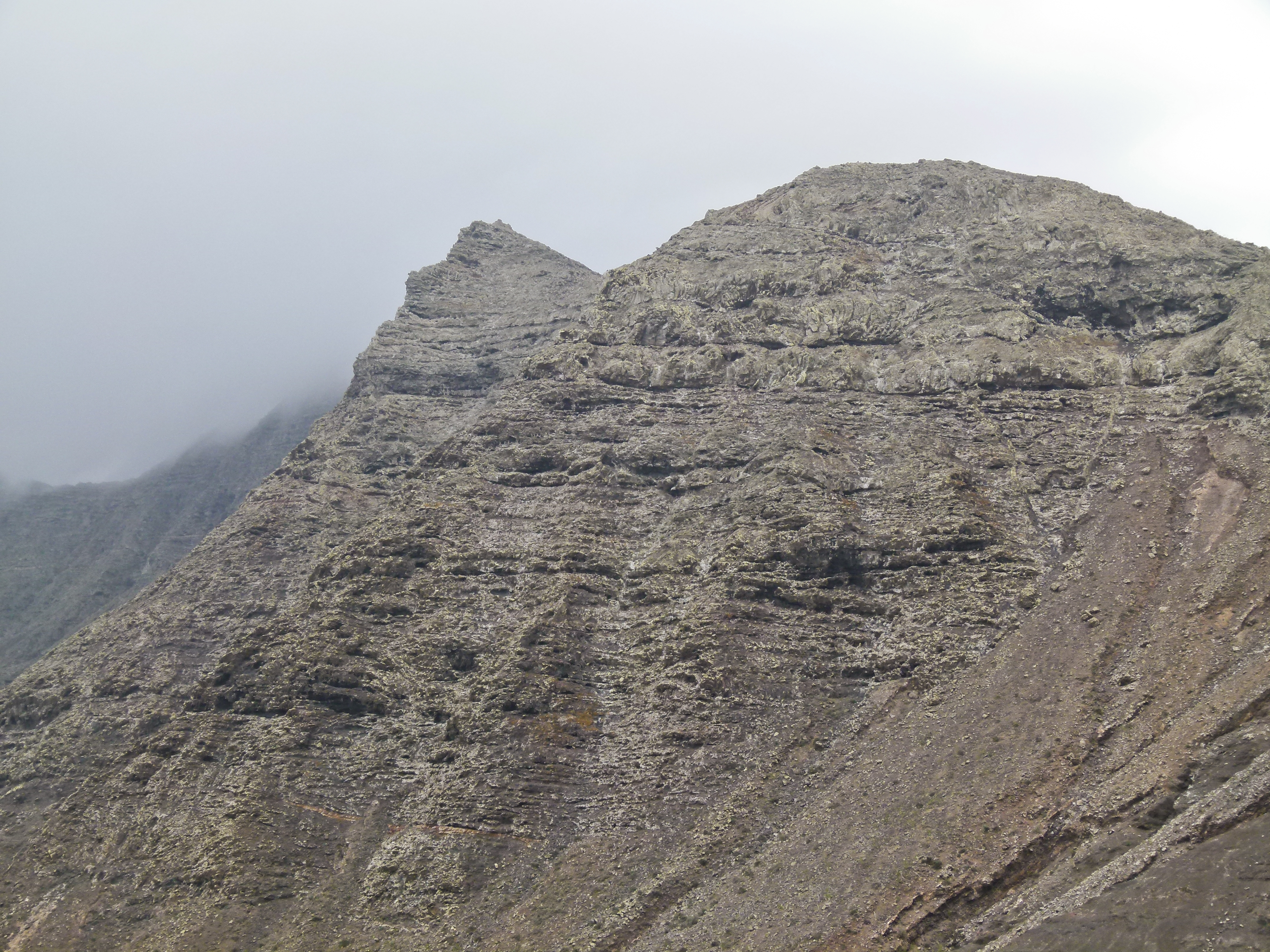
Miocene basaltic lava flows of the Jandía Edifice at Pico de la Palma (foreground) and Pico de la Zarza (background), Fuerteventura

Due to its old age, the oceanic crust at Fuerteventura is relatively rigid and this has prevented subsidence and allowed weathering and erosion to expose deep levels of the island's geological structure.

The two main rock sequences of Fuerteventura are (1) a lower, older (Cretaceous to early Miocene) sequence of sedimentary, plutonic and submarine seamount volcanic rocks with intrusive dykes, often called the "Basal Complex", which is unconformably overlain by (2) a younger sequence of Miocene, Pliocene and Quaternary subaerial volcanic rocks.

The oldest rocks of Fuerteventura are a set of mafic plutonic rocks, marine sedimentary rocks and volcanic rocks, which are intruded by igneous dykes. The sedimentary rocks of the Basal Complex were deposited on the ocean floor and represent the uppermost part of the oceanic crust that was uplifted and incorporated into the volcanic edifice during volcanic activity. The Mesozoic sedimentary rocks are mostly metamorphosed, and they are steeply tilted. The tilting occurred in the mid-Cretaceous and was probably caused by the uplift of Africa. Fuerteventura's first alkaline magmatism intruded plutonic rocks into the oceanic crust at about 70 Ma. This signifies a change to a hotspot environment. A submarine seamount started to form on the ocean floor during the Eocene Epoch, at about 39 Ma. The igneous rocks of the Basal Complex probably represent the seamount stage of Fuerteventura's volcanic history, exposed due to uplift and erosion.

In the early Miocene, volcanic activity transitioned from submarine to subaerial while the volcanic edifice was gradually built up above sea level. Fuerteventura has the oldest subaerial volcanic rocks of the Canary Islands, which have been dated to 20.2 Ma. There were three main shield volcanoes built on the seamount base (from north to south): the Northern Edifice, the Central Edifice and the Jandía Edifice. The central shield volcano is the oldest, built mostly from 22 to 18 Ma but with a later phase from 17.5 to 13 Ma. The southern shield volcano formed from 21 to 14 Ma. The northern shield volcano was built mainly from 17 to 12 Ma. These shield volcanoes erupted mostly basaltic and trachybasaltic lava flows.

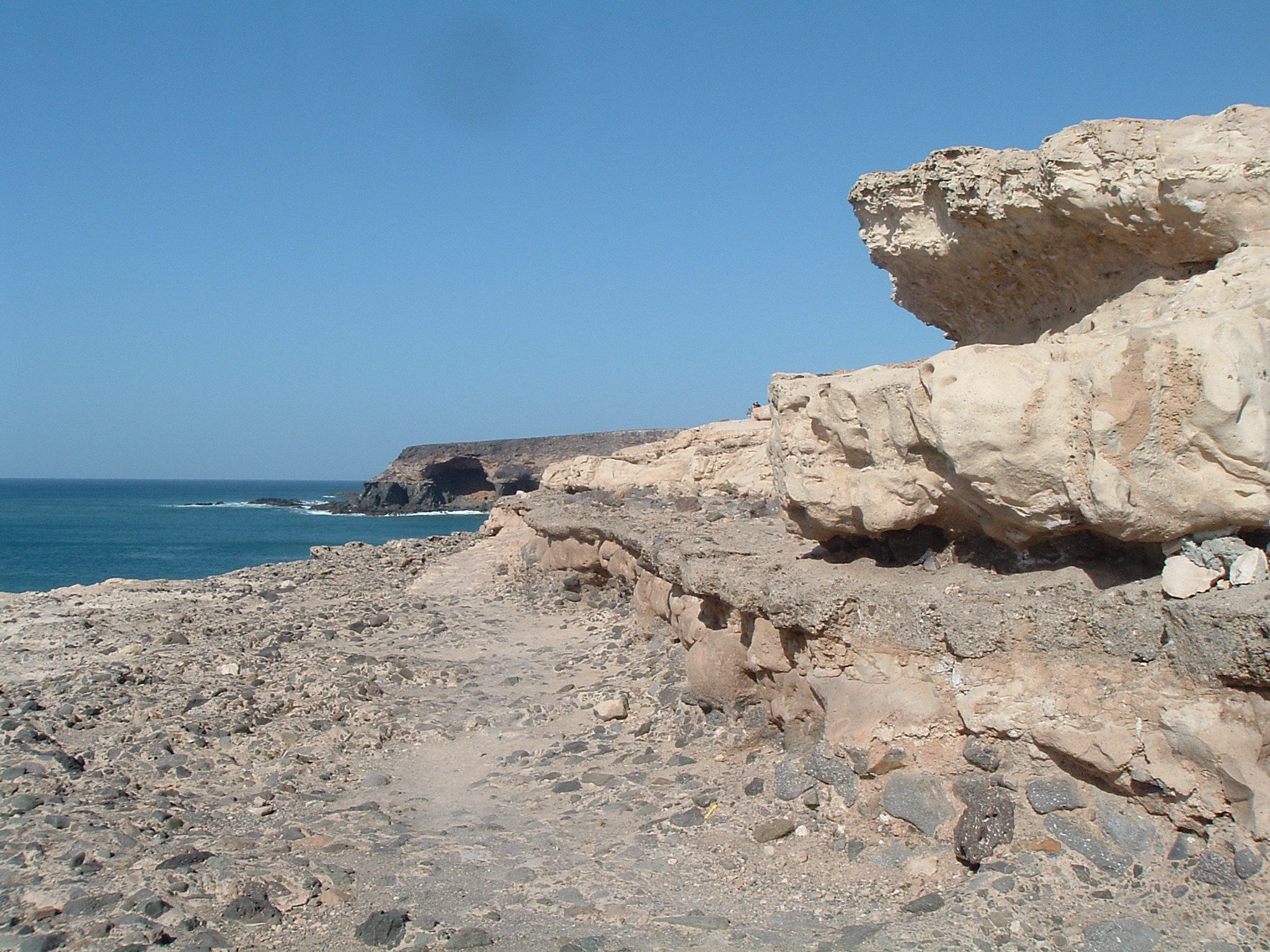
Pliocene fossiliferous sedimentary rocks at Ajuy, Fuerteventura (foreground cliff height is approximately 2 metres (6.6 ft))

In the late Miocene (from about 11.5 Ma), there was a pause in volcanic activity (the erosional stage). Minor volcanic eruptions resumed in the Pliocene, at about 5.1 Ma (the rejuvenation stage) and they continued sporadically into the Quaternary, with basaltic lava flows dominating again.

The most recent volcanic eruption on Fuerteventura that has been dated occurred 134,000 years ago in the Middle Pleistocene. Some undated volcanic cones in northern Fuerteventura may have formed more recently. According to the Smithsonian Institution's Global Volcanism Program, there have been no dated confirmed Holocene eruptions but the freshness of some lavas and some volcanic landforms suggests that they may have been formed in the Holocene.

Weathering, erosion and sedimentation during the Pliocene and Quaternary formed coastal and shallow-sea sedimentary rocks that were eventually covered by younger aeolian sediments, alluvial fan deposits and palaeosols.

== Gran Canaria ==
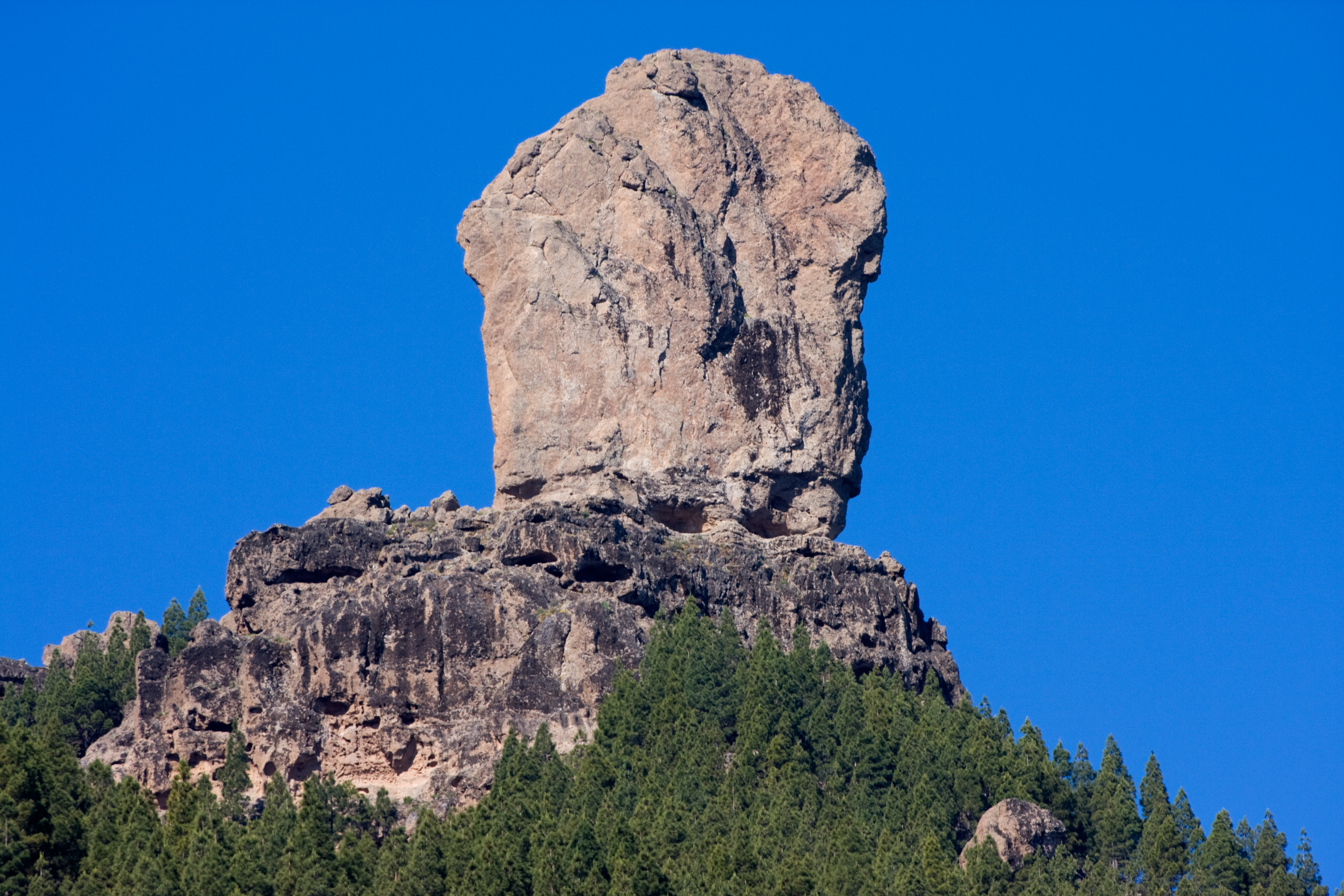
Roque Nublo, an 80-metre-tall (260 ft) monolith that is part of a debris avalanche deposit, Gran Canaria

After early Miocene submarine volcanic eruptions created a seamount, subaerial volcanic activity at Gran Canaria occurred in three phases: shield stage (middle- and late-Miocene, 14.5 to 8.5 Ma), erosional stage (late Miocene, 8.5 to 5.3 Ma) and rejuvenated stage (Pliocene to Quaternary, 5.3 Ma to present).

The shield stage started with an early phase of eruptions of basaltic lava flows, from 14.5 to 14.1 Ma, which built the main subaerial shield volcanic edifice that forms three quarters of the subaerial volume of Gran Canaria. At least three shield volcanoes were active during this stage of island development and their lava flows gradually merged into a single large landform. This was followed by a later phase, from 14.1 to 8.5 Ma, of explosive volcanic eruptions of differentiated felsic lavas (phonolites, trachytes and rhyolites) with many pyroclastic flows (that deposited ignimbrites). In central Gran Canaria, Tejeda caldera and a cone sheet swarm were formed in this phase.

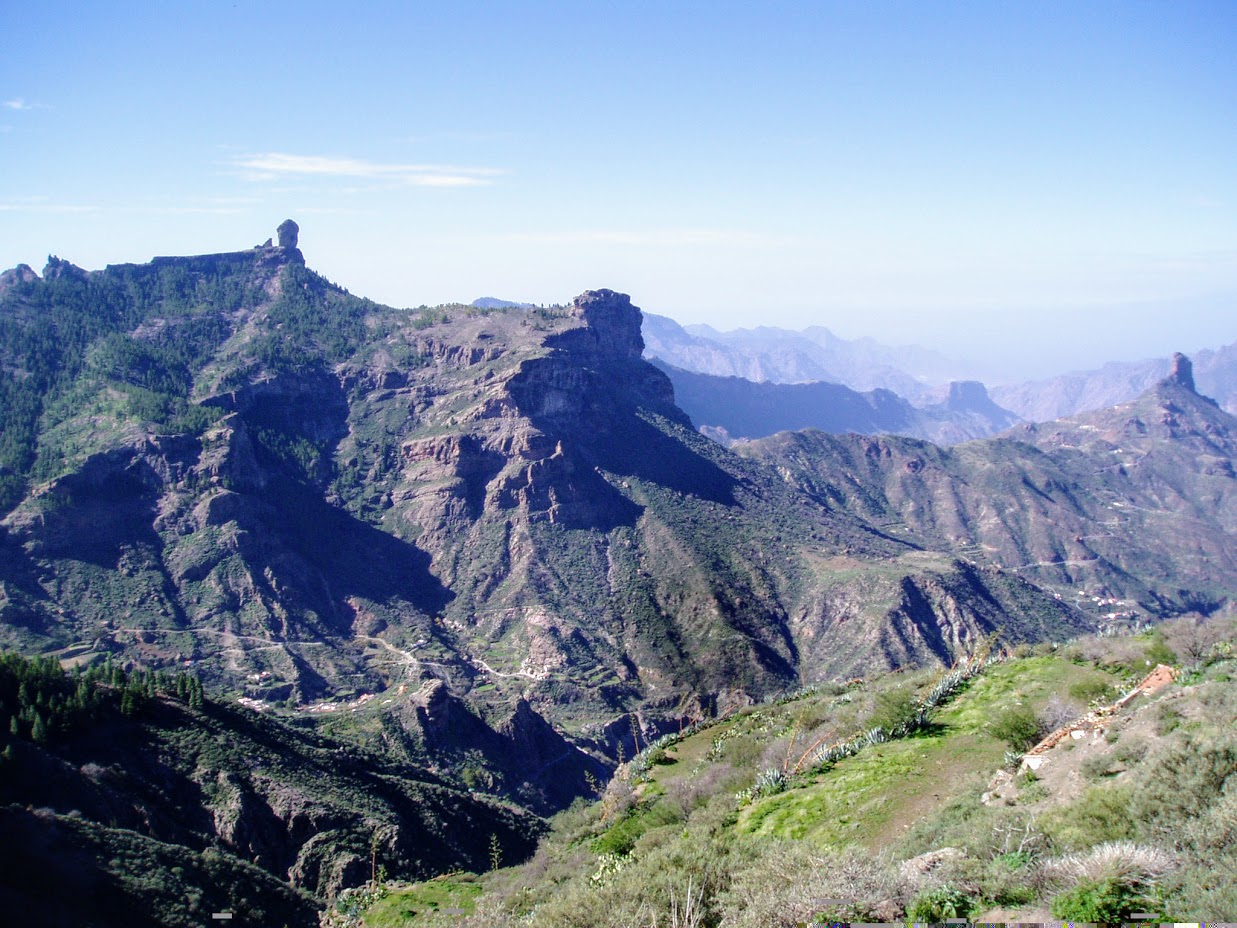
Remains of Roque Nublo stratovolcano, Gran Canaria

From 8.5 to 5.3 Ma, in the erosional stage, there was minimal volcanic activity. Erosion occurred along with deposition of alluvial sediments on the island and deposition of submarine turbidite sediments offshore.

In the rejuvenation stage, from 5.3 Ma to present, volcanic activity has occurred in three phases. The first phase, from 5.3 to 2.7 Ma, was dominated by the formation of Roque Nublo stratovolcano in the central part of Gran Canaria. This produced lava flows, ignimbrites and debris avalanche deposits. The second phase (3.5 to 1.5 Ma) had strombolian-style effusive eruptions of lava flows along a northwest–southeast trending volcanic rift. The current phase, from 1.3 Ma to the present, has featured scattered phreatomagmatic and strombolian eruptions of very alkaline lavas. The most recent volcanic eruption on Gran Canaria occurred about 2,000 years ago at Bandama crater, in the northeast part of the island.

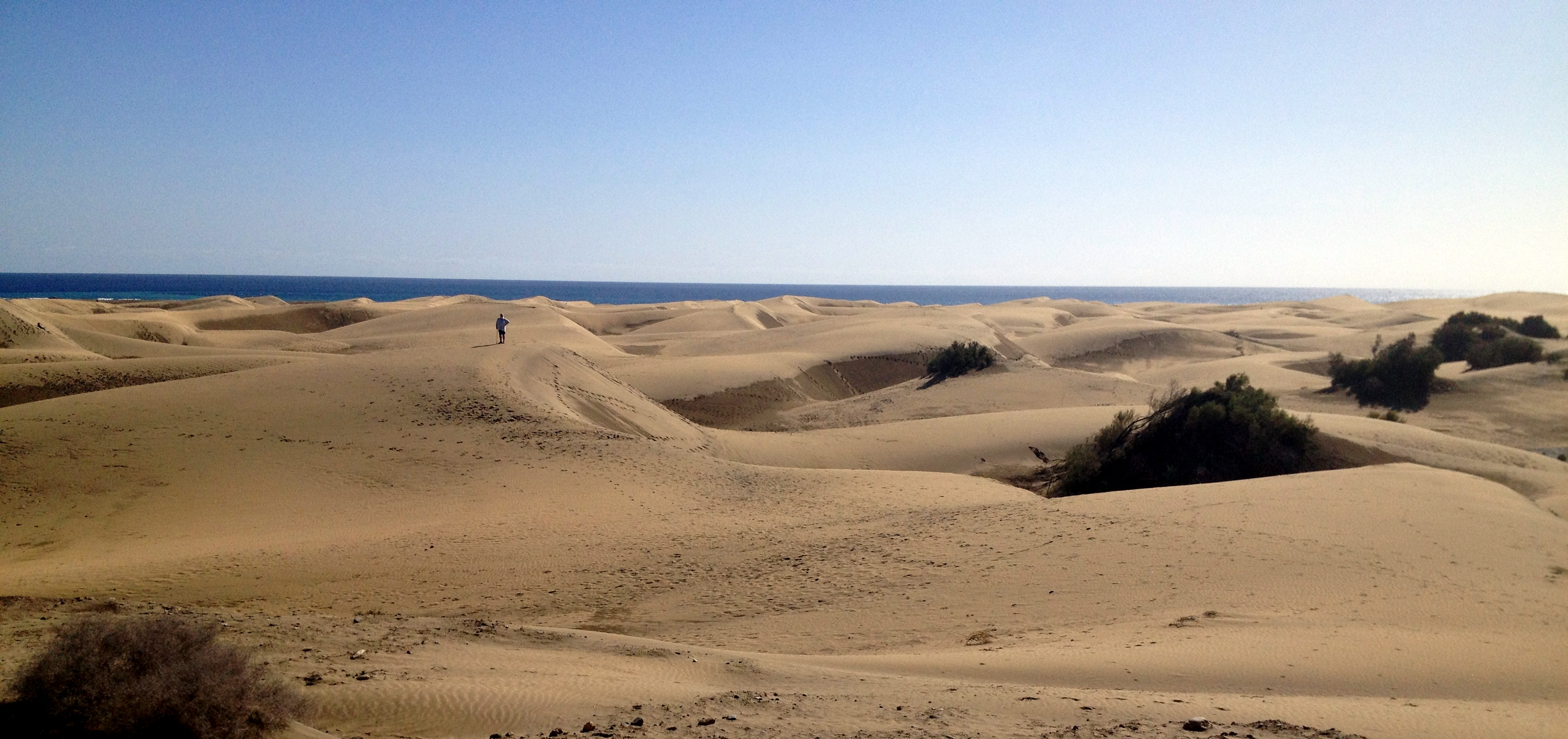
Sand dunes at Maspalomas, Gran Canaria

Sand dunes, with a total volume of 18.6 million cubic metres (24.3×10^{6} cu yd), cover an area of 3.6 km^{2} (1.4 sq mi) of the Maspalomas cuspate foreland on Gran Canaria's south coast. Aeolian landforms found in this dune field include barchan dunes and dune ridges (transverse dunes). The dunes are made of sand grains and pebbles. The average thickness of the dunes is 5–10 m (16–33 ft) but some dunes reach 20 m (66 ft) thick. In a few areas, the underlying deltaic sediments are exposed. The sand that has built the dunes has been moved about 2 or 3 km (1 or 2 mi) by water waves and wind from the sediment source area (an offshore submarine shelf at Playa del Inglés). Since the 1960s, urbanisation has affected the local winds and this has caused the gradual reduction in volume and area of the dune field because sediment erosion now exceeds sediment deposition. A study from 1990 reported that the dunes had formed during the last several thousand years. A 2008 study, however, found evidence supporting a hypothesis that the dunes formed less than 300 years ago, as a consequence of a tsunami generated by the 1755 Lisbon earthquake.

== Tenerife ==
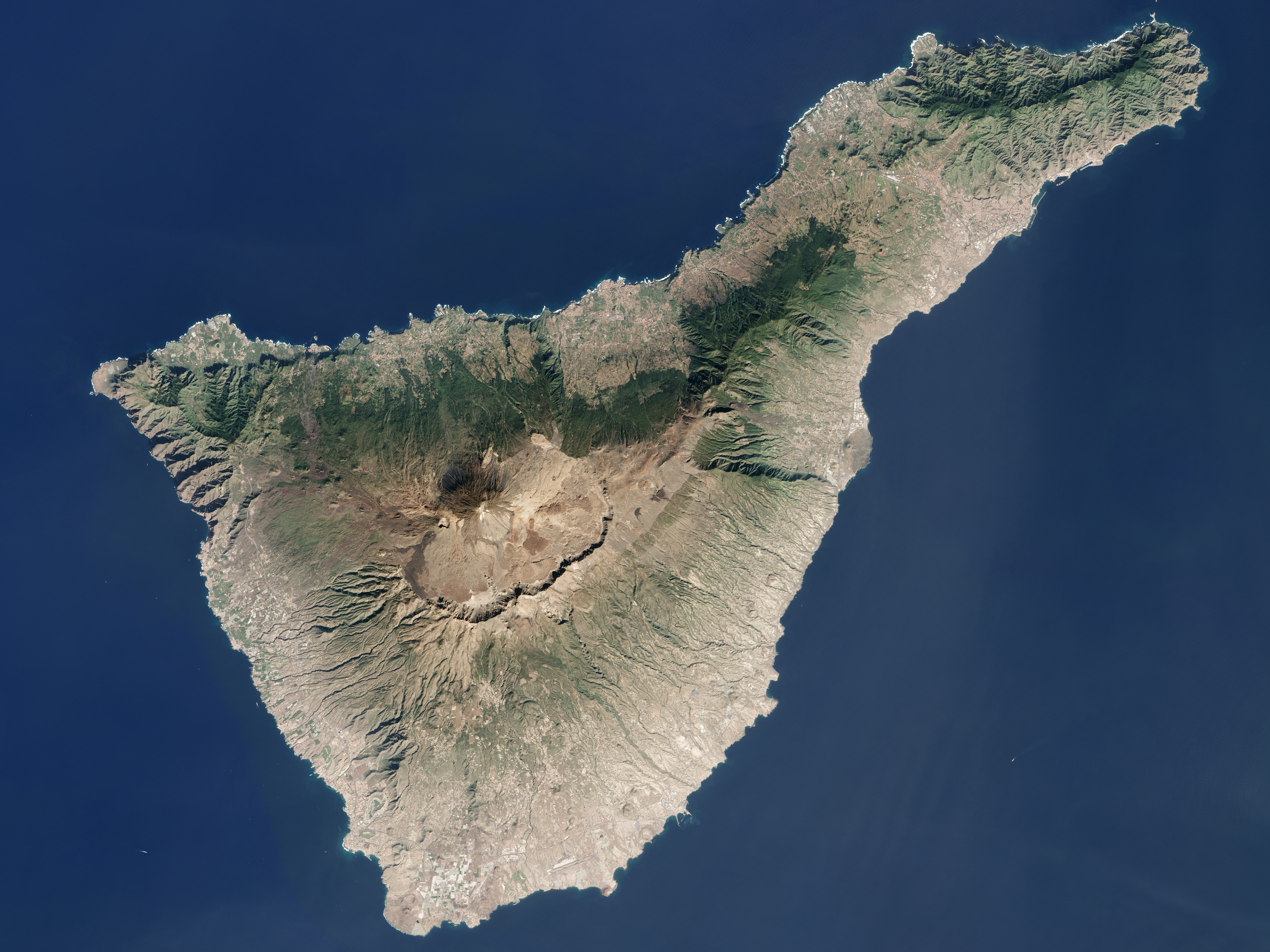
Satellite image of Tenerife: Teide–Pico Viejo Volcanic Complex in Las Cañadas caldera (centre), Teno massif (north-west, centre-left) and Anaga massif (north-east, top right)

Tenerife's subaerial shield stage of island development started at about 11.9 Ma in the late Miocene Epoch. First, a shield volcano called Tenerife central shield volcano grew as an island at what is now the central part of Tenerife. This central shield volcano was active from 11.9 to 8.9 Ma. Most of this central shield volcano's lavas have been covered by younger lavas from younger volcanoes; some small patches of the central shield volcano's lavas are now preserved as the Roque del Conde massif in the centre of the island. Then, in northwestern Tenerife, a second shield volcano (Teno shield volcano) formed from 6.4 to 5.1 Ma; its remains are the Teno massif. Then, from 4.9 to 3.9 Ma, a third shield volcano (Anaga shield volcano) was active in the northeastern part of Tenerife; the remains of this volcano are the Anaga massif. The lavas of these three shield volcanoes gradually formed a combined volcanic edifice that accounts for 90% of Tenerife's current volume.

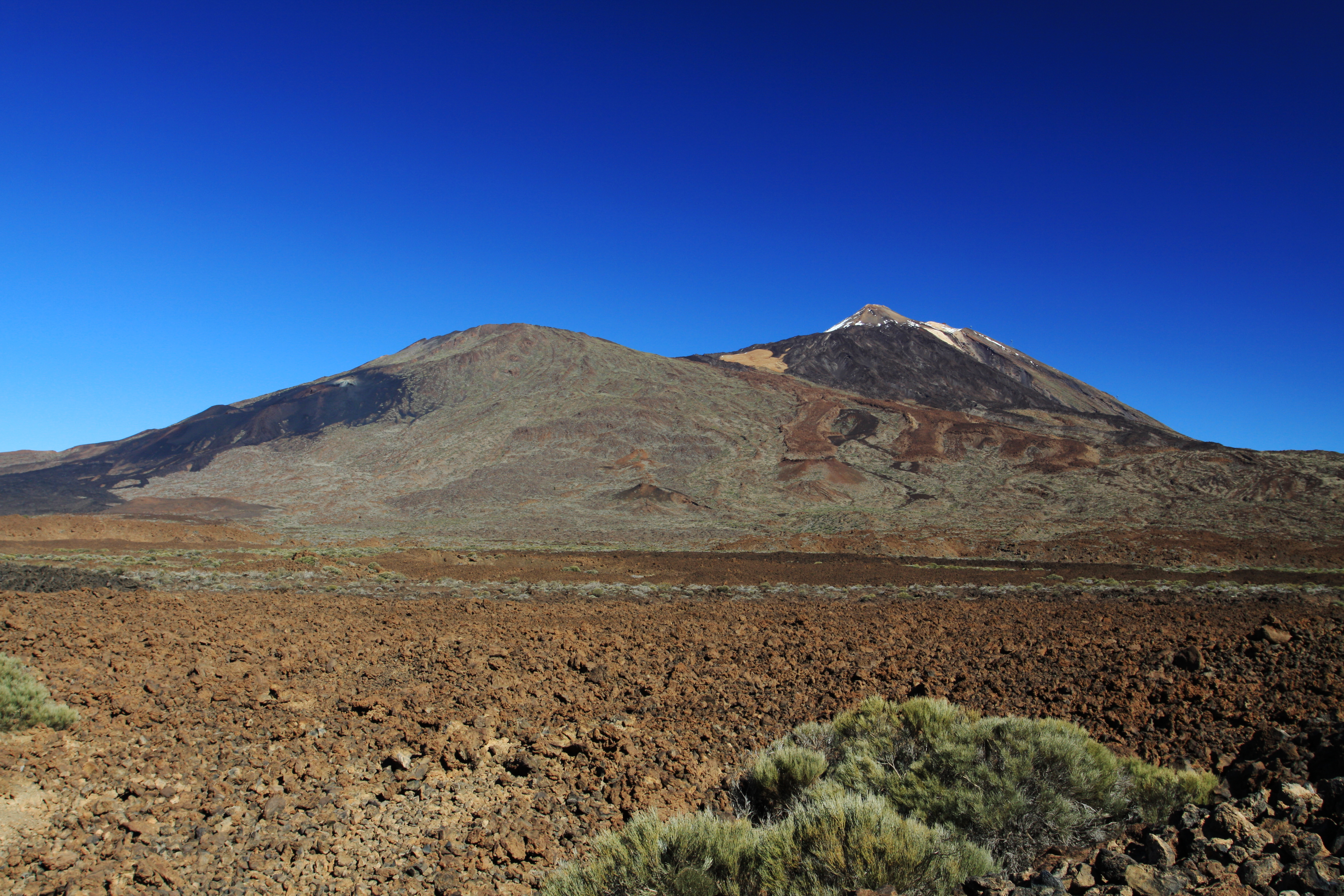
Pico Viejo (left) and Teide (right) in Las Cañadas caldera, Tenerife

The rejuvenation stage of Tenerife (after a long erosive gap in activity at the centre of Tenerife) started at about 4 Ma and continues to the present day. Between 4.0 and 0.2 Ma, a large stratovolcano (Las Cañadas volcano) formed, centred in the central part of Tenerife. Las Cañadas volcano covered some parts of the three older shield volcanoes. This volcanic activity at the centre of Tenerife has included cycles of basaltic lavas (e.g. basanites and tephrites) alternating with significant amounts of magmatically differentiated (more felsic and more alkaline) lavas (e.g. tephri-phonolites and phonolites). Central volcanic activity has been accompanied, since 3 Ma, by mostly basaltic fissure eruptions at a three-armed Y-shaped radial rift zone system (Note: The rift zone system is Y-shaped when viewed from above or displayed on a map.) that has northwest, northeast and south rift zones. In eastern Tenerife, large landslides on the flanks of the ridge (known locally as Cumbre Dorsal) that marks the northeast rift zone, formed Güímar valley sometime between 850,000 and 570,000 years ago, La Orotava valley sometime between 570,000 and 540,000 years ago, and another valley less than 560,000 years ago. Between about 200,000 and 170,000 years ago, Las Cañadas volcano collapsed, forming Las Cañadas caldera. The nature of this collapse has been studied by many geologists during the last two centuries. Suggested causes of Las Cañadas volcano's collapse are landslide (the Icod landslide), or explosive volcanic eruption, or a combination of both. In this 16 km × 20 km (9.9 mi × 12.4 mi) caldera, since about 170,000 years ago, two related stratovolcanoes have formed: Teide (most of its eruptions occurring before 30,000 years ago) and its younger, smaller, western, close neighbour Pico Viejo (most of its eruptions occurring between 27,000 and 14,600 years ago). Both of these stratovolcanoes are still active. Together with some satellite vents, they form the Teide–Pico Viejo Volcanic Complex. (Note: Teide and Pico Viejo are referred to in various ways: for example, Teide stratocone and Pico Viejo stratocone, Teide edifice and Pico Viejo edifice, Teide stratovolcano and Pico Viejo stratovolcano, Teide–Pico Viejo stratovolcano, Teide volcano and Pico Viejo volcano, Teide–Pico Viejo Volcanic Complex, and Teide Volcanic Complex.) Most of Tenerife's volcanic eruptions of the last 15,000 years have occurred at the northwest rift zone.

During the Holocene Epoch, Tenerife has had 42 confirmed volcanic eruptions, which is more than any other Canary island.

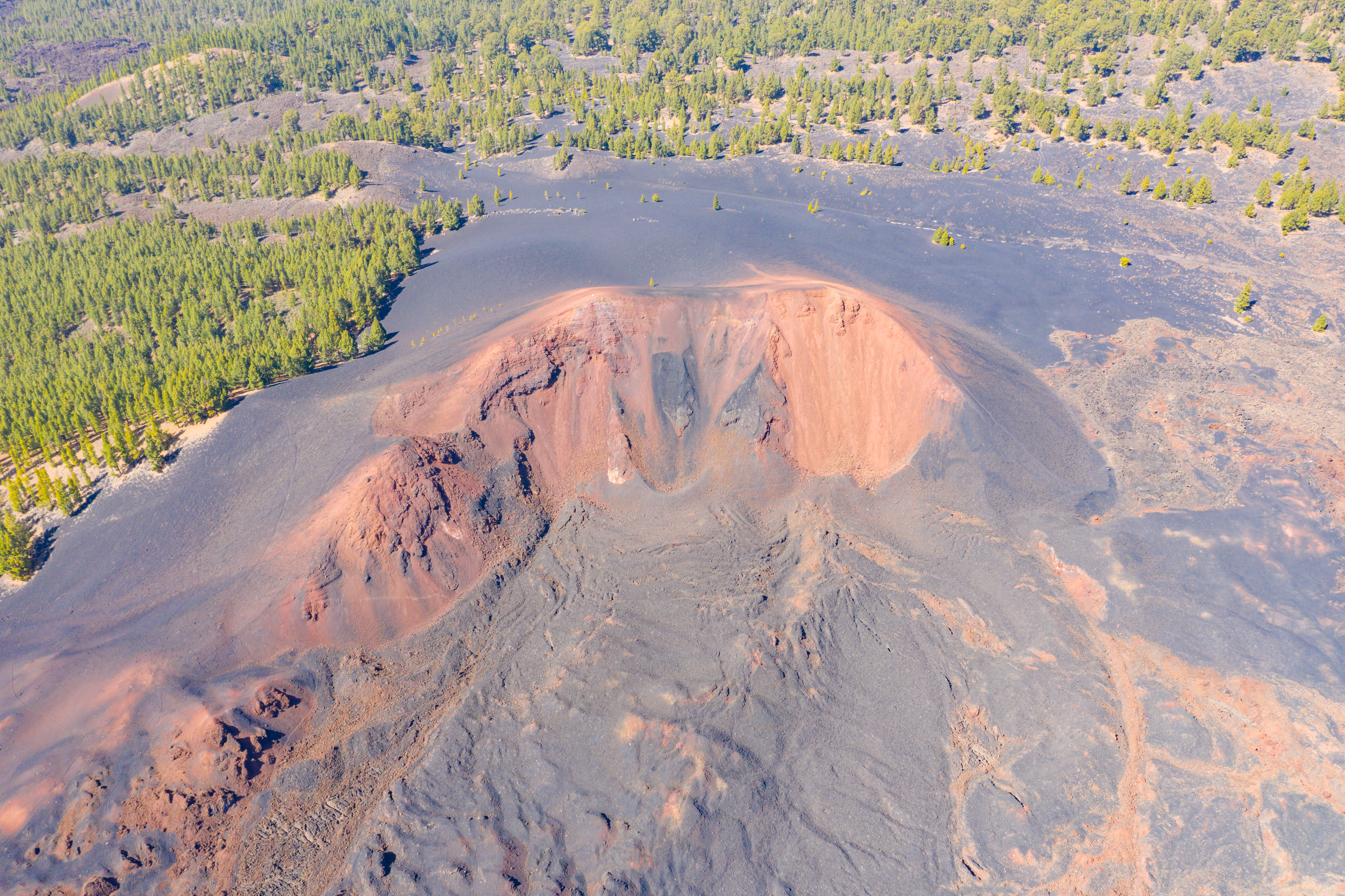
Aerial view of Chinyero, the site of the most recent volcanic eruption (1909) on Tenerife

The most recent eruption of lava at Teide's summit vent occurred 1,150 years Before Present. The latest eruption of Pico Viejo is the Chahorra flank eruption of 1798. The most recent eruption in the northeast rift zone is the 1704–1705 eruption at Siete Fuentes/Volcán de Fasnia/Las Arenas. The most recent volcanic activity at the northwest rift zone has been the Boca Cangrejo (1492), Garachico/Boca Negra (1706) and Chinyero (1909) eruptions.

At Teide, the volcanic edifice of Tenerife consists of the remains of the submarine seamount, covered by the remains of the central shield volcano, covered by the remains of Las Cañadas stratovolcano, capped by the cone of Teide stratovolcano. (Note: The base of Teide stratovolcano's cone is on the floor of Las Cañadas caldera at a height of approximately 2,345 m (7,694 ft) above sea level and the cone's summit has an elevation of 3,715 m (12,188 ft) above sea level. Teide stratovolcano's volcanic cone is approximately 1,370 m (4,490 ft) tall.) Measured from the ocean floor, the total height of Tenerife's edifice is 7,500 m (3,715 m above sea level), making it one of the tallest volcanic edifices on Earth (some volcanic edifices in Hawaii are taller). Tenerife is currently at the point in its geological development where the effects of constructive volcanic eruption and destructive erosion are roughly balanced.

== La Gomera ==
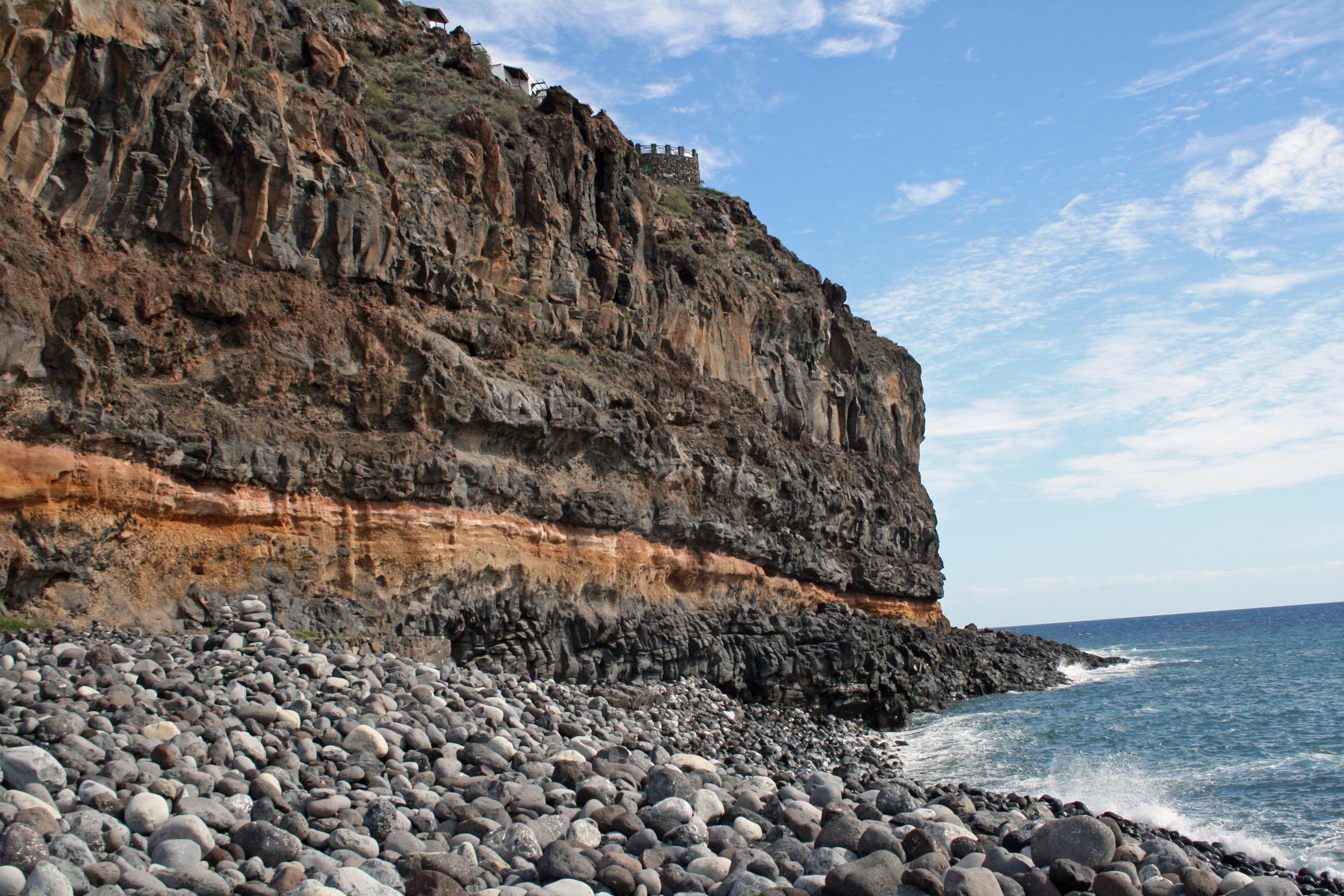
Playa de Santiago on the south coast of La Gomera where a cliff exposes Lower Pliocene dark-coloured lava flows (cliff height: approximately 50 m (160 ft))

The seamount base (also known as the Submarine Edifice) of La Gomera was built by volcanic eruptions during the Miocene Epoch. The precise age range of this submarine volcanic activity is uncertain. Dating done in the early 1970s suggested that submarine volcanic eruptions occurred from 20 Ma to 15 Ma, followed by an erosion gap of 5 million years. The reliability of these dates has been questioned; dating done in the 2000s suggests that submarine volcanic eruptions began instead at about 12 Ma. At the end of the seamount stage, the seamount was uplifted and its top surface was eroded. There are a few small areas of old lava flows that some geologists claim represent an upper part of the submarine seamount (a "Basal Complex" similar to those found on some of the other Canarian islands) but this is disputed; an alternative explanation is that these old lavas instead represent early subaerial shield volcano eruption material that flowed off the island into the ocean.

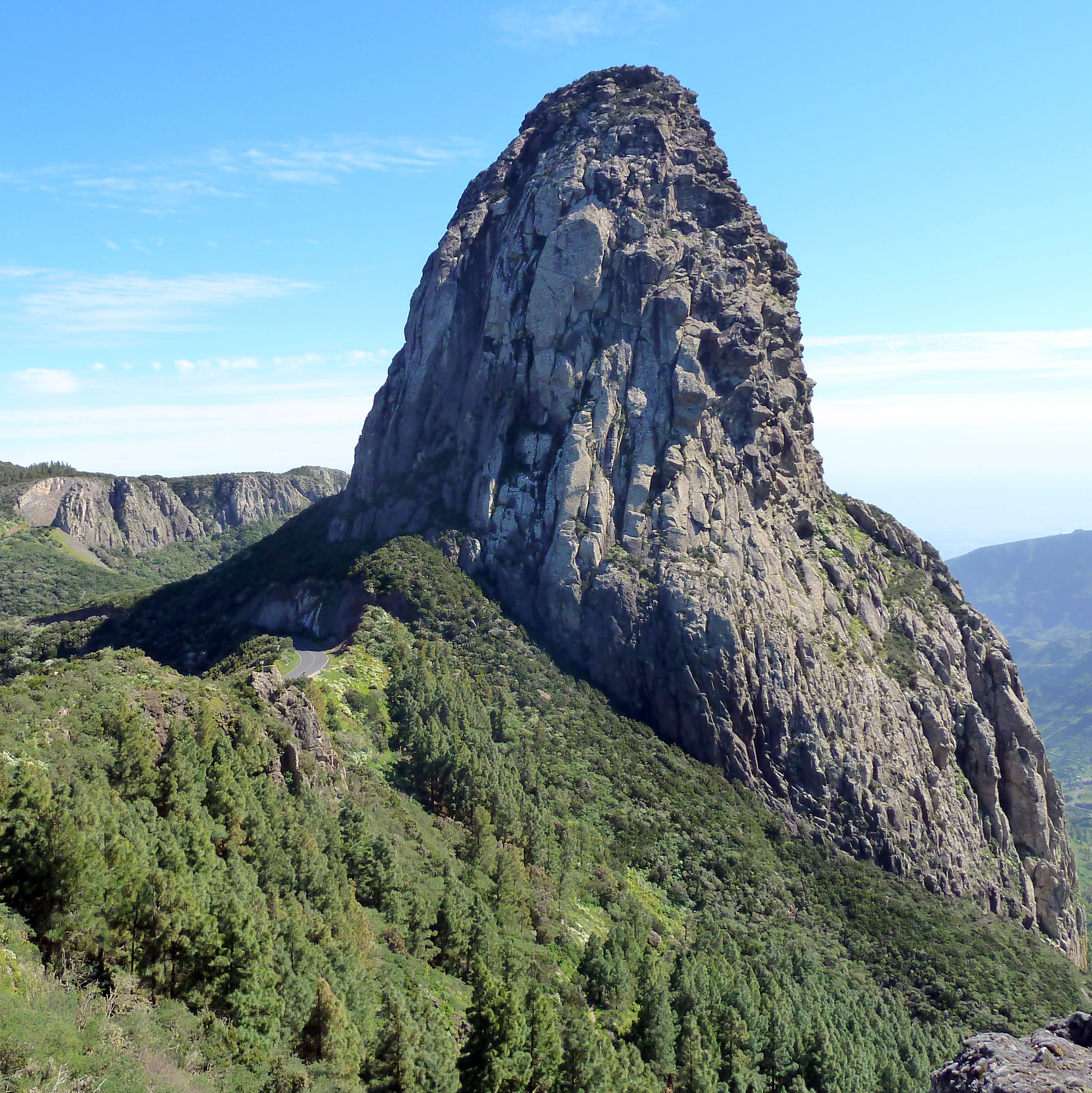
Roque de Agando, a 220-metre-tall (720 ft) Pliocene lava dome on La Gomera

In the late Miocene, at about 11 Ma, La Gomera's shield-building stage began. The oldest subaerially-erupted lavas on La Gomera have been dated to 9.4 Ma. Most of the subaerial shield volcano's growth occurred from 9.4 to 8.0 Ma. The shield volcano lavas are also known as the Old Edifice. About 8 Ma, the northern part of the mafic alkaline shield volcano collapsed (the Garajonay landslide).

From 7.5 Ma to 6.5 Ma, the Vallehermoso stratovolcano grew on top of the partially collapsed shield volcano by eruption of relatively felsic lavas (phonolites and trachytes) which covered much of the older shield volcano.

In the early Pliocene, from 5.5 Ma to 4.2 Ma, basaltic lavas were erupted from highland volcanic vents; these lavas flowed over much of the island. For the last 4 million years, there have been no significant volcanic eruptions on the island and La Gomera has been in the erosional stage of its development. (The island's most recent volcanic eruption was a minor monogenetic eruption at Barranco del Machal, during the Early Pleistocene, about 1.94 Ma). Erosion has removed cinder cones (La Gomera now has only one well-preserved cinder cone, named La Caldera, on the island's south coast) and exposed the deeper parts of the volcanic edifices, revealing volcanic plugs, dykes, cone sheets, and lower lava flows.

Volcanic eruptions may resume on La Gomera in the future, but some geologists have suggested that La Gomera is already volcanically extinct.

== La Palma ==
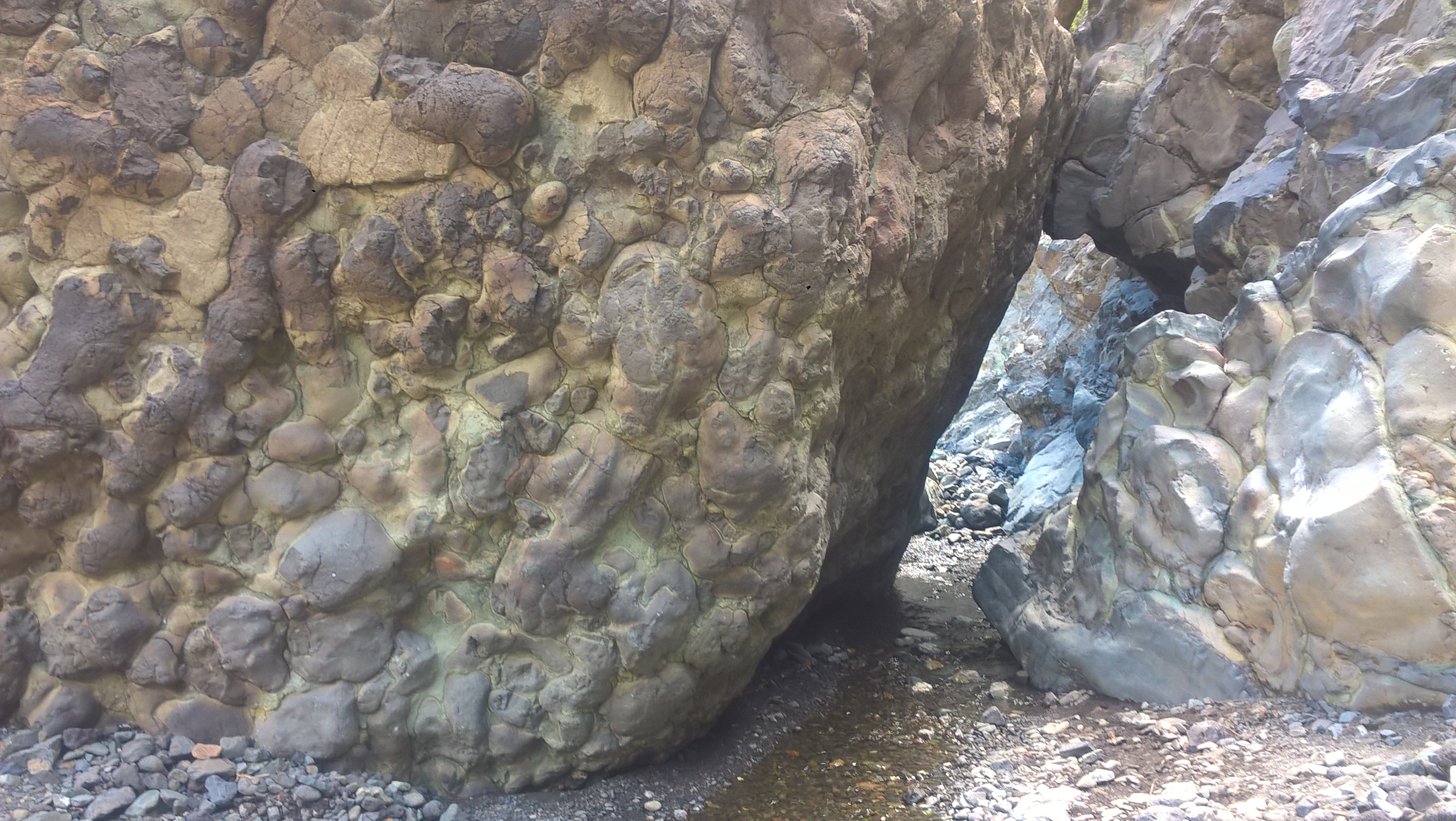
Pillow lava of the Basal Complex in Barranco de las Angustias, La Palma

La Palma's submarine seamount formed from 4 Ma to 3 Ma, in the Pliocene Epoch. The seamount stage rocks are layers of basaltic to trachytic pillow lavas with hyaloclastites and pillow breccias. The seamount's volcanic rocks have been intruded by younger mafic plutons and a mafic dyke swarm. Between 3 Ma and 1.77 Ma, the seamount rocks were uplifted, tilted and eroded. The structurally deepest rocks of the seamount have been metamorphosed to greenschist facies. Small remnants of the seamount stage rocks are now exposed on La Palma as its "Basal Complex", for example in Barranco de las Angustias.

La Palma's shield-building stage began at 1.77 Ma - the Garafía shield volcano grew, on top of the seamount, between 1.77 Ma and 1.20 Ma (forming the present-day northern part of La Palma), with the oldest subaerial lavas dated to 1.7 Ma. This shield volcano grew quickly to a height of about 3,000 m (9,800 ft) and a diameter of about 23 km (14 mi) but this volcano became unstable and its southern flank collapsed in a large landslide at 1.2 Ma. Only a small part of Garafía shield volcano is visible now because much has been eroded away or is buried by younger lavas. After the Garafía landslide, the focus of volcanic activity moved slightly to the south, producing another shield volcano, named Taburiente volcano, on top of Garafía shield volcano's collapsed southern flank.

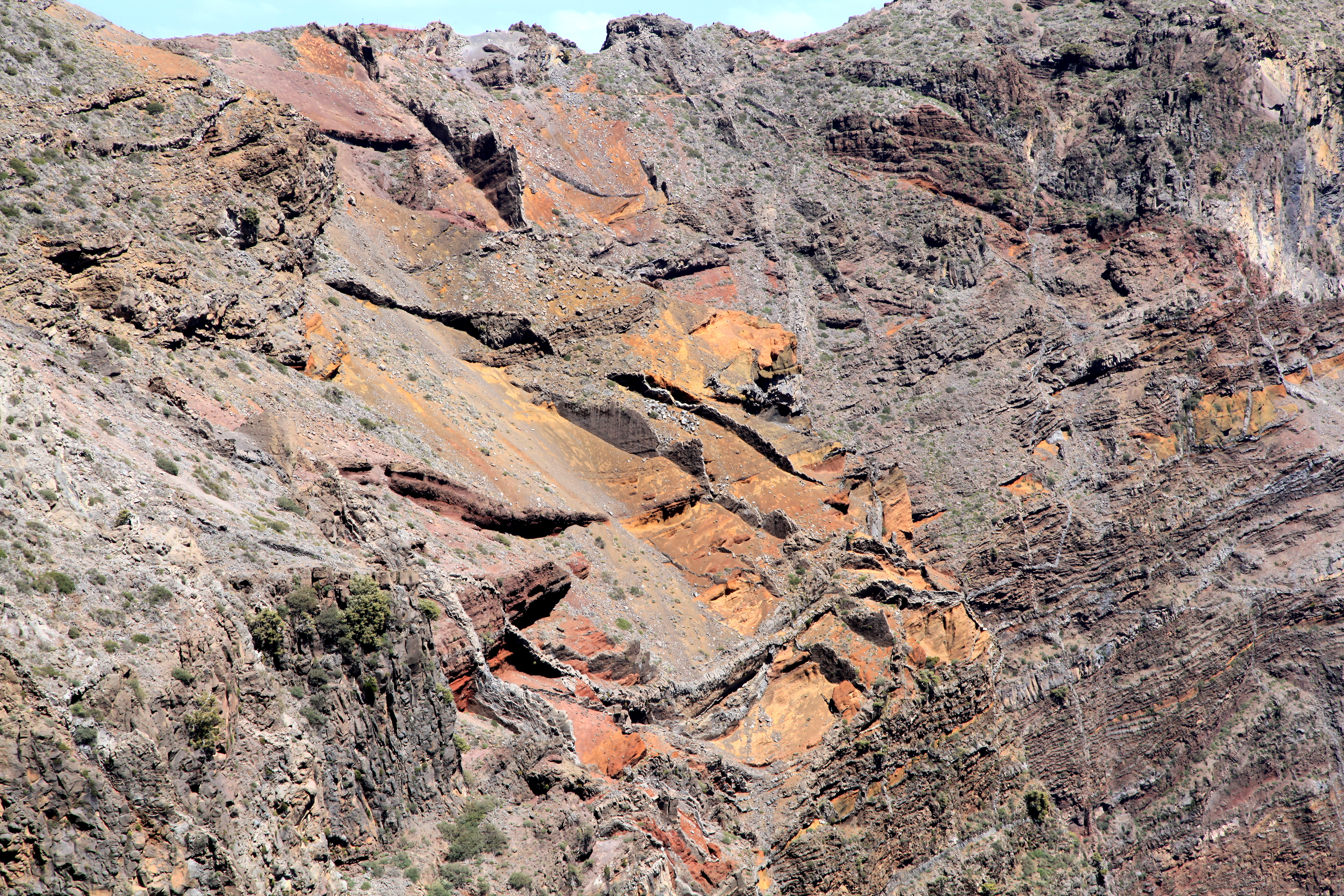
Internal structure of Taburiente volcano (consisting of lava flows, tephra and dykes) exposed in the northern cliff of Caldera de Taburiente at Roque de los Muchachos, La Palma (scale: approximately 1,000 metres (3,300 ft) across)

For most of its active period, Taburiente shield volcano erupted basaltic lavas but final phases of its formation included phonolitic and trachytic lavas. Together, the three successive, superimposed shield volcanoes (the seamount, Garafía and Taburiente) form the Northern Shield.

A three-armed Y-shaped volcanic rift system developed at Taburiente volcano; this northern La Palma rift system had three radial arms - northwest, northeast and south - meeting at the shield volcano's summit. Gradually, most of Taburiente's volcanic activity became focused on the south rift. From 810,000 to 560,000 years ago, the southern part of Taburiente shield volcano's edifice grew by volcanic eruptions at the south rift; these eruptions formed Cumbre Nueva, a 10 km-long (6 mi) north-south volcanic ridge in what is now central La Palma. Cumbre Nueva had a period of particularly rapid growth from 621,000 to 566,000 years ago.

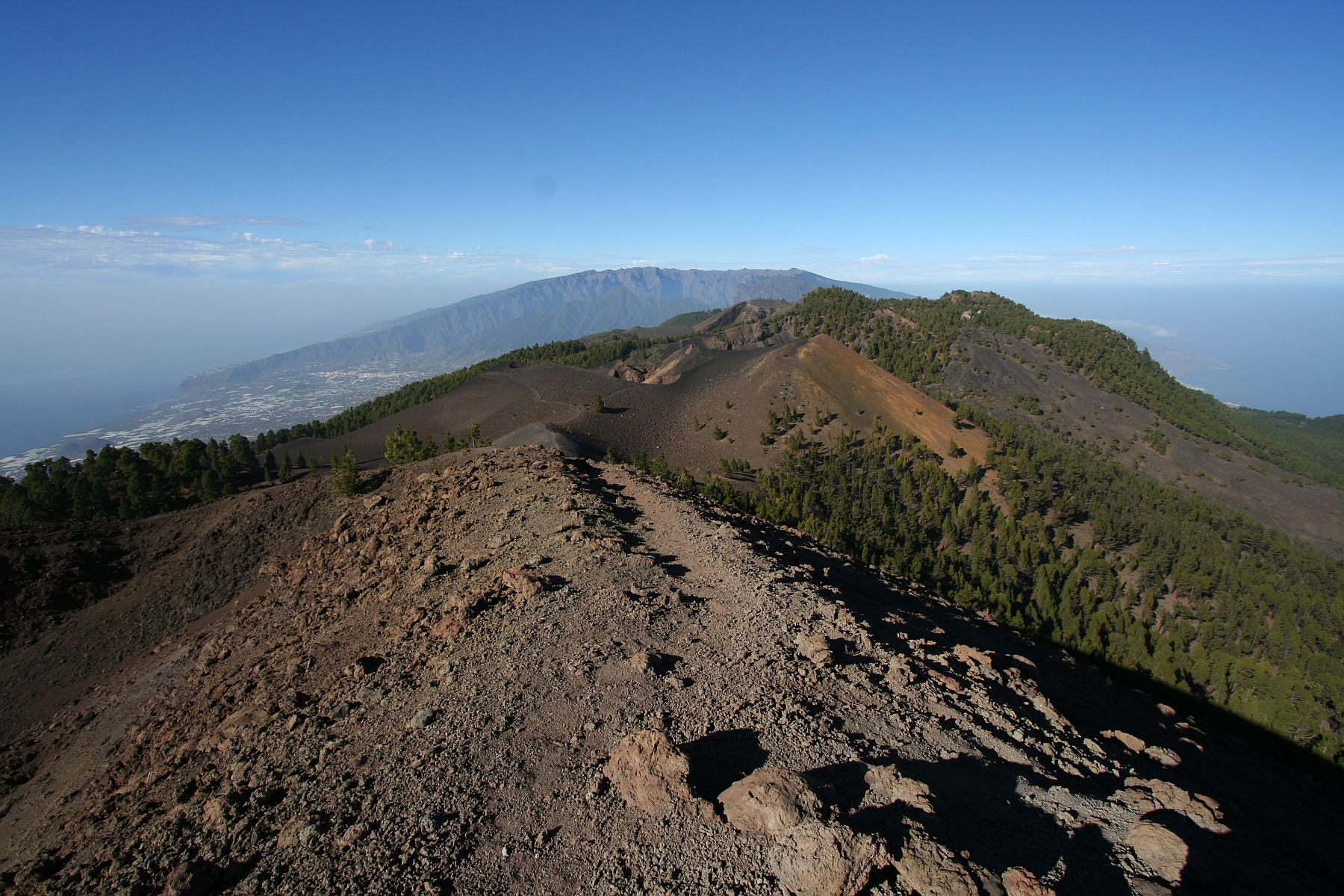
The Northern Shield (background) and Cumbre Vieja (middle and foreground), looking north from Deseada, La Palma

Taburiente volcano grew to an estimated maximum height of about 3,000 m (9,800 ft) but, about 525,000 years ago, its edifice became unstable and part of its southern flank (including much of the west flank of Cumbre Nueva) collapsed laterally in a landslide with a volume of more than 200 km^{3} (48 cu mi), resulting in the formation of a large crater named Caldera de Taburiente; it is an erosion caldera formed by mass wasting, not a collapse caldera formed by volcanic eruption. The Caldera de Taburiente is a topographic depression; from the time of the landslide until the present day, it has been enlarged by erosion and is now 15 km (9.3 mi) long, 6 km (3.7 mi) wide and 1.5 km (0.93 mi) deep. Also after the landslide, Cumbre Nueva grew rapidly again until about 490,000 years ago. A small stratovolcano, named Bejenado volcano, started forming on the floor of the Caldera de Taburiente about 523,000 years ago; it erupted lavas until about 491,000 years ago. Eruptions of lava occurred at Taburiente volcano until about 400,000 years ago. Volcanic activity then appears to have paused for the next 275,000 years.

About 125,000 years ago, the focus of volcanic activity moved south again, with eruptions of mostly mafic alkaline lavas gradually forming Cumbre Vieja, a 20 km-long (12 mi) ridge-shaped elevated rift zone volcano that has grown until the present day at southern La Palma's north–south volcanic rift zone. Cumbre Vieja reaches 1,949 m (6,394 ft) in height and it dominates the geology of the southern half of the island. (Note: Cumbre Vieja means Old Summit; Cumbre Nueva means New Summit. The Old and New adjectives refer to dates of forestation. Geologically, however, Cumbre Vieja is younger than Cumbre Nueva.) From 125,000 to 20,000 years ago, volcanic eruptions occurred on all arms of southern La Palma's triple-armed volcanic rift system. Between 20,000 and 7,000 years ago, volcanic activity declined on the northwest arm and stopped completely on the northeast arm.

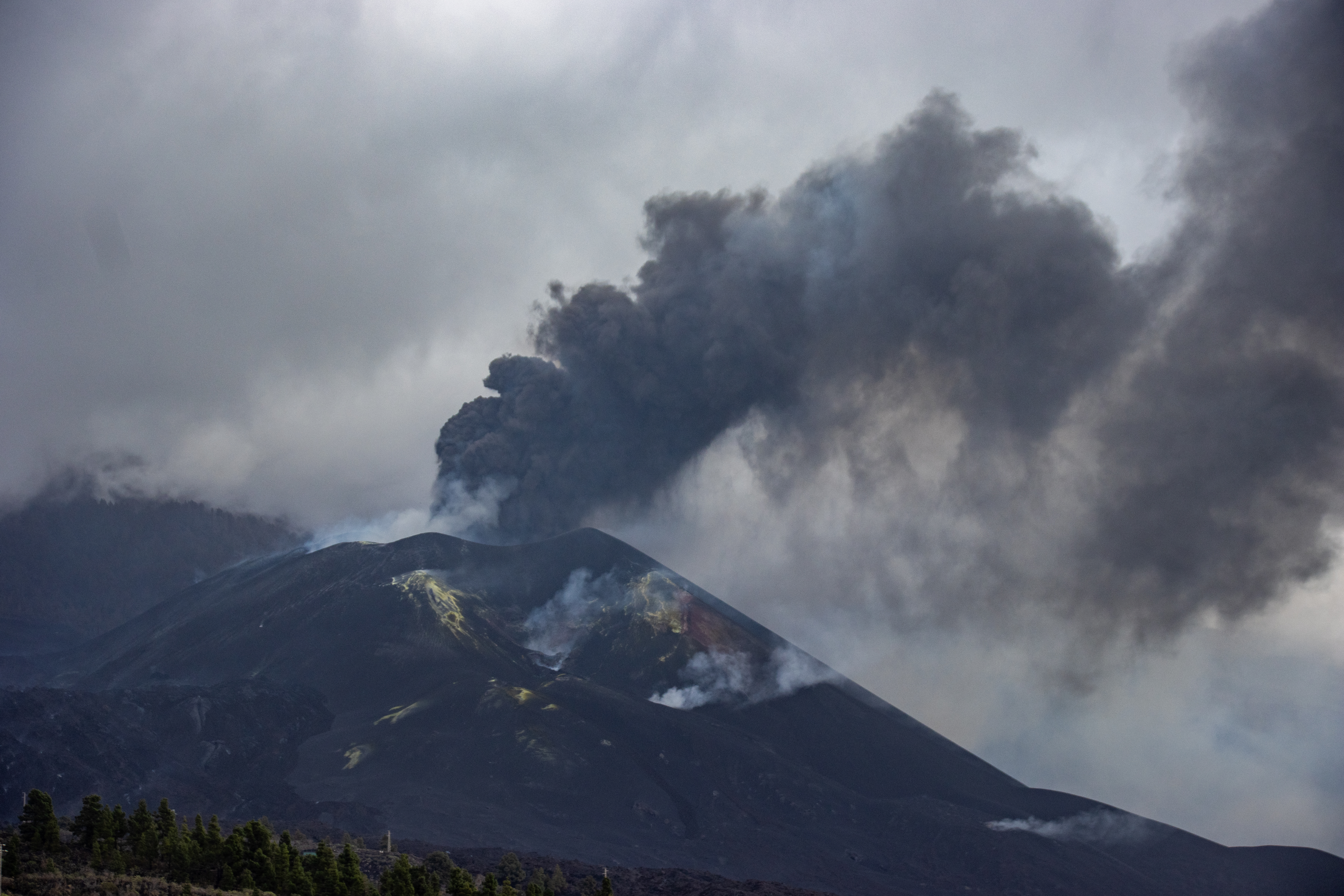
Eruption at Tajogaite cinder cone on the west flank of Cumbre Vieja, La Palma (4 December 2021)

Seven confirmed historical eruptions have occurred at Cumbre Vieja, making La Palma the most volcanically active of the Canary Islands and accounting for half of all the volcanic eruptions in the Canary Islands during this c. 535 year timespan. These historical eruptions have mostly been of the strombolian type, forming cinder cones; magmas have been predominantly mafic in composition but some more felsic phonolites have also been produced. Cumbre Vieja is still volcanically active; its three most recent eruptions are Nambroque (1949), Teneguía (1971) and Tajogaite (2021). Geologically recent volcanic eruptions have also occurred along the submarine section of the north–south rift zone that extends about 20 km (12 mi) beyond the southern tip of the island.

Day et al. (1999) suggested that the west flank of Cumbre Vieja is in the initial stages of instability. Modelling by Ward and Day (2001, 2005) led them to suggest that if a large landslide of Cumbre Vieja's volcanic rocks were to occur in the next few thousand years, it could displace a large volume of ocean water that would cause widespread tsunami damage along Atlantic Ocean coastlines. This suggestion has been opposed by some geologists who assess southern La Palma's volcanic rift zone to be stable and any generated tsunami would be much smaller than Ward and Day's modelled size, suggesting that Cumbre Vieja's collapse and damage scenarios would be less severe than Ward, Day and some popular science television documentaries have claimed. (See also: Cumbre Vieja tsunami hazard and Megatsunami).

== El Hierro ==
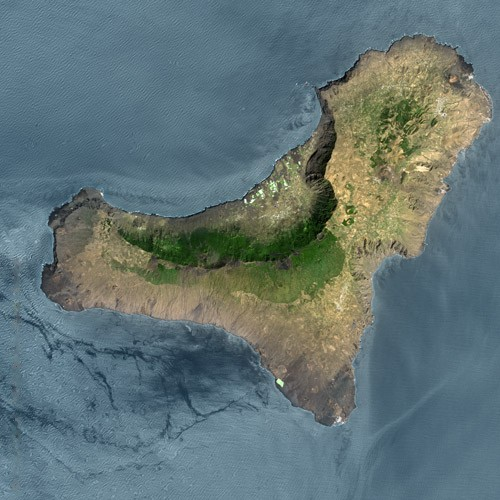
Satellite image of El Hierro showing Y-shaped triple-arm rift zones and curved lateral collapse cliffs and bays

El Hierro is the youngest and smallest of the seven main Canary Islands. El Hierro is in its shield-building stage.

During the Early Pleistocene, a submarine seamount grew upwards from the ocean floor, almost to sea level, on top of Cretaceous-Pliocene oceanic sediments.

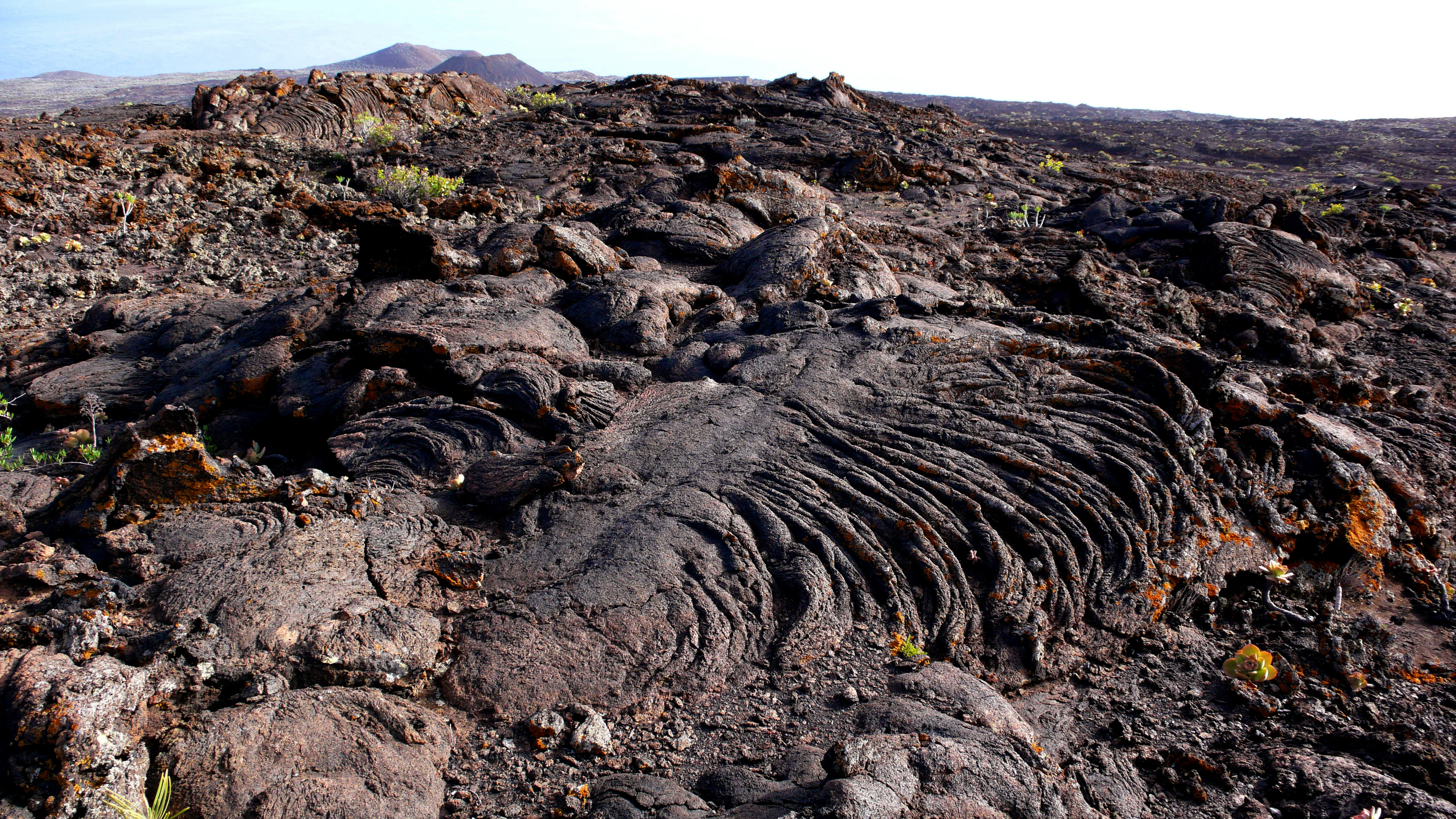
Pahoehoe lava flows ("Los Lajiales") and volcanic cones of the rift volcanism phase at the south-south-east rift zone, near La Restinga, El Hierro

Then, at 1.2 Ma, Tiñor shield volcano began to form on top of the seamount. Tiñor volcano's first subaerial lava was erupted at 1.12 Ma. Tiñor grew by erupting lavas across what is now the eastern half of El Hierro until about 882,000 years ago; the eruptions were mostly of effusive basaltic lava, but there was also an explosive, xenolith-rich last eruptive phase (the Ventejís volcanics). Instability in the edifice of Tiñor volcano resulted in the Tiñor lateral collapse landslide at about 882,000 years ago when much of the volcano's northwest flank slid downwards and onto the ocean floor. This left a curved bay where the volcano's flank had been.

About 545,000 years ago, El Hierro's second subaerial shield volcano, named El Golfo volcano (also known as the El Golfo-Las Playas Edifice), (Note: El Golfo is a shield volcano on El Hierro. El Golfo is also the name of a tuff cone volcano on the west coast of Lanzarote.) started erupting. Its summit was slightly to the west of Tiñor volcano. Lavas from El Golfo volcano filled the bay that had been formed by the Tiñor landslide. El Golfo volcano's later lava flows covered the remains of Tiñor volcano. At its maximum development, El Golfo volcano was about 2,000 m (6,600 ft) high and about 20 km (12 mi) in diameter, with a surface area slightly larger than present-day El Hierro and about twice the area that Tiñor volcano had covered. El Golfo volcano grew by erupting lava from a Y-shaped rift system with west-north-west, north-north-east and south-south-east arms; most of the eruptions occurred on the west-north-west and north-north-east arms. El Golfo volcano gave El Hierro a roughly circular shape at this time. El Golfo volcano's early-stage lavas are basaltic in composition; its late-stage lavas (erupted between about 176,000 and 158,000 years ago) are of more chemically differentiated composition (trachyte).

The volcanic edifices of El Hierro were affected by at least two other large lateral collapse landslides of uncertain age:

1. the El Julán lateral collapse, in which much of the southwest flank of El Golfo volcano slid downwards and onto the ocean floor, occurred at least 158,000 years ago;
2. at least 145,000 years ago, the Las Playas lateral collapse occurred on the southeast flank of El Golfo volcano.
3. At about 100,000 years ago, slumping near Las Playas did not result in complete downward slumping of El Golfo volcano's southeast flank into the ocean; instead, a large block of rock moved about 300 m (980 ft) down a steeply-inclined fault (the now inactive San Andrés fault) in what has been described as an "aborted" lateral collapse.

El Hierro's third, and current, major phase of volcanic activity is rift volcanism; it started about 158,000 years ago. This rift volcanism occurs at a Y-shaped volcanic rift zone system with west-north-west, north-north-east and south-south-east arms that meet at the centre of the island; all of the three rift arms have been very volcanically active. There are about 200 monogenetic cinder cones along the ridge crests of the three rift zones; this is the most densely concentrated group of such cones in the Canary Islands. Rift phase lavas cover most of the island, not only forming the ridges along each rift zone but also partially infilling the landslide bays. The rift zones extend outwards as submarine volcanic ridges on the ocean floor; for example, the south-south-east rift zone extends underwater to at least 40 km (25 mi) south of the island.

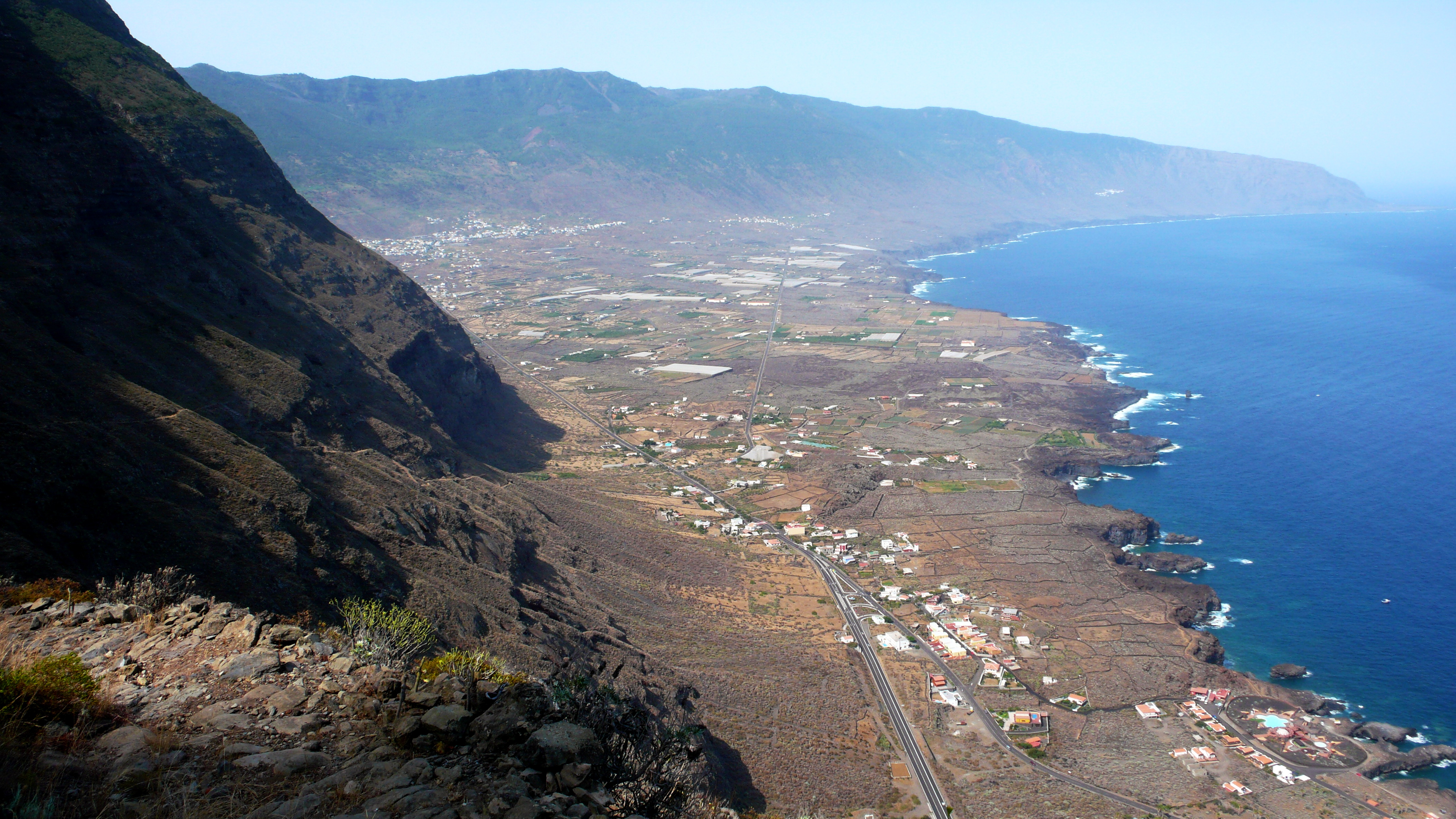
El Golfo landslide scarp, depression (now a coastal plain) and bay, El Hierro

Instability in the edifice of El Golfo volcano resulted in El Hierro's youngest and largest landslide, the El Golfo lateral collapse landslide, when a large part (with a volume of 180 km^{3} (43 cu mi)) of the volcano's northern flank slid downwards off the island and onto the ocean floor; individual blocks of moved material, up to 1,200 m (3,900 ft) across, have slid as much as 65 km (40 mi) from their original positions. This landslide formed the curved 14 km-wide (8.7 mi) El Golfo bay and a curved landslide scar depression, where the volcano's flank had been; the bay still forms the curved northwest coast of El Hierro. The El Golfo landslide scarp is preserved today as a 26 km-long (16 mi) cliff with a maximum height of 1,400 m (4,600 ft); the cliff is roughly parallel to the coast but about 2–4 km (1.2–2.5 mi) inland, except at each end, where the cliff meets the coast. The age of the El Golfo lateral collapse landslide is poorly constrained; it occurred sometime between 133,000 and 13,000 years ago. Evidence found on land favours the older end of this age range; evidence on the ocean floor favours a young age. Carracedo et al. (1999) have suggested that the conflicting evidence from land and ocean floor can be reconciled if there were two landslides instead of a single event: first, a collapse of the subaerial part of the El Golfo volcanic edifice at 133,000 years ago, then a submarine landslide at 13,000 years ago.

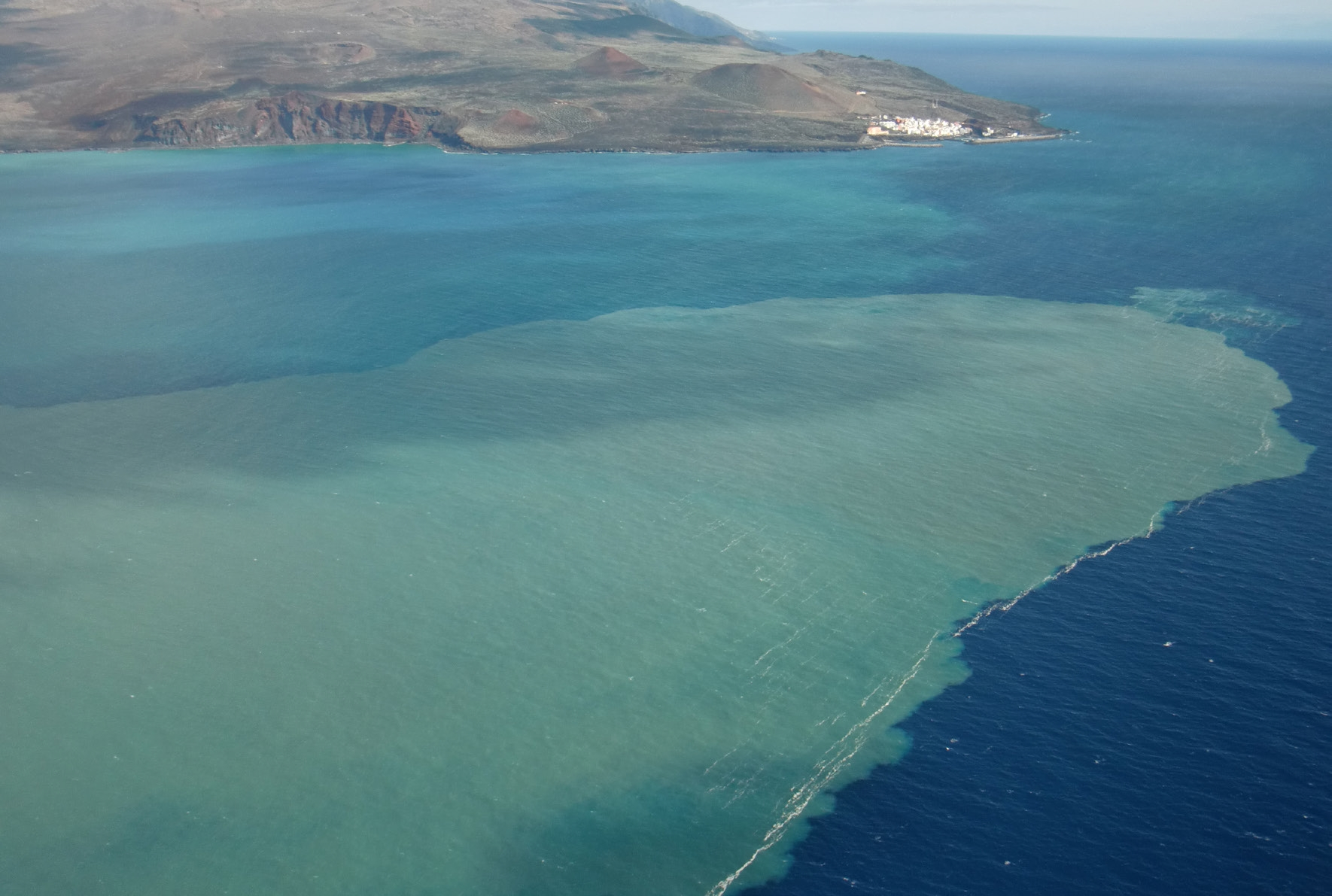
Aerial view of the green eruption plume of the Tagoro submarine eruption at El Hierro, 2011–2012 (with the village of La Restinga in the background)

It has been estimated that the large landslides on El Hierro removed more than two-thirds of the total volume of lava erupted subaerially by the two shield volcanoes and the rift cinder cones of the island. This removal of lava has hindered efforts to estimate El Hierro's magma production and eruption rates.

In the last 33,000 years, 31 land-based volcanic eruptions are known to have occurred on El Hierro. Of the volcanic eruptions on land at El Hierro that have been dated, the two most recent were at 2,500 years ago (at Montaña Chamuscada), and 2,280 years ago (at Montaña Los Cascajos), both located on the north-north-east rift.

In 2011, a period of seismic unrest (associated with underground movements of molten magma) was followed by El Hierro's most recent volcanic eruption, which occurred underwater on the volcanic rift about 2 km (1.2 mi) south of the southern tip of the island. From October 2011 to March 2012, lava erupted from a submarine volcanic vent, which was later named Tagoro. Initially, this volcanic edifice was at a depth of 350 m (1,150 ft), but by the end of the eruption, the edifice had grown to 88 m (289 ft) below sea level.

== Possible future islands ==
One or more of the seamounts in the western part of the Canary Volcanic Province may erupt enough lava to form new islands in the future. For example, El Hijo de Tenerife is a 600 m-tall (2,000 ft) seamount on the ocean floor between Gran Canaria and Tenerife. It is about 200,000 years old and it is thought that it may form a new island within the next 500,000 years. This seamount is in one of the most seismically active parts of the Canary Islands region.

A group of three seamounts called Las Hijas (Spanish for 'The Daughters') are located on the ocean floor 70 km (43 mi) southwest of El Hierro. These seamounts were surveyed by side-scan sonar in 1997 and were assumed to be less than about 500,000 years old and, therefore, were suggested as candidates for eventually becoming new islands. However, later dating of rock samples from Las Hijas has yielded ages of about 141 Ma, which would make Las Hijas probably the oldest seamounts in the Atlantic Ocean. This old age prompted an alternative name to be suggested: 'Bisabuelas' (Spanish for 'Great-grandmothers').

== Volcanic landforms ==
The Canary Islands have examples of many types of volcanic landforms. Some examples are listed in the following table:

Volcanic landforms in the Canary Islands
Landform	Example	Image	Coordinates	Reference
Caldera (collapse)	Las Cañadas caldera, Tenerife. The caldera's floor is partially covered by some lava flows.		28°15′29″N 16°34′44″W	
Caldera (erosional)	Caldera de Taburiente, La Palma		28°43′26″N 17°52′48″W	
Cinder cone	Cinder cone of the Areñas Negras group, about 30,000 years old, in Las Cañadas caldera on Tenerife		28°17′42″N 16°33′36″W	
Columnar jointing	"Los Órganos", cliff on the north coast of La Gomera		28°13′01″N 17°16′37″W	
Cone sheet	Tejeda cone sheet swarm on Gran Canaria. The cone sheets are at the centre of the photo and are steeply inclined from upper right to lower left.		27°59′10″N 15°41′38″W	
Crater row	Volcanic cone/crater row (the Calderas Quemadas) in Timanfaya National Park, Lanzarote		28°59′49″N 13°45′36″W	
Dyke	Vertical dyke at the roadside in Las Cañadas caldera at Boca de Tauce, Tenerife		28°12′51″N 16°40′41″W	
Hornito	Manto de la Virgen, a hornito in Timanfaya on Lanzarote		29°00′33″N 13°45′33″W	
Kipuka	Montaña Caldereta, an Early Pleistocene volcanic cone surrounded by 50-metre-thick (160 ft) black lava erupted during the Timanfaya 1730–1736 eruption on Lanzarote		29°02′31″N 13°43′01″W	
Lava coulée	Lava coulée on Montaña Rajada at Minas de San José in Las Cañadas caldera on Tenerife		28°16′04″N 16°35′38″W	
Lava delta	Lava delta at Garachico, on which the town was rebuilt after a northwest rift zone volcanic eruption in 1706 on Tenerife filled the bay and partially destroyed the old town		28°22′26″N 16°45′50″W	
Lava dome	Fortaleza de Chipude on La Gomera		28°06′00″N 17°16′37″W	
Lava field	Lava field at Timanfaya on Lanzarote		29°00′22″N 13°45′47″W	
Lava flow	Black lava flow of the 1909 eruption of Chinyero volcanic vent (off to the left) that solidified around Montaña Bilma volcanic cone (upper right) in the northwest rift zone of Tenerife		28°17′38″N 16°47′06″W	
Lava lake (solidified)	A solidified lava lake (hidden from view) covers the floor of La Cazoleta volcanic vent (centre left), with the taller Pico Partido volcanic cone in the background, in Timanfaya on Lanzarote		29°00′40″N 13°43′05″W	
Lava tube	Cueva de los Verdes lava tube on Lanzarote		29°09′37″N 13°26′21″W	
Littoral cone	Montaña Amarilla on Tenerife		28°00′36″N 16°38′13″W	
Maar	El Cuchillo maar on Lanzarote		29°05′20″N 13°39′14″W	
Monogenetic volcanic group	Montañas del Fuego monogenetic volcanic group of volcanic cones in Timanfaya on Lanzarote		29°00′11″N 13°45′00″W	
Parasitic cone	Chahorra parasitic cone (dark cone in centre) on the flank of Pico Viejo stratovolcano (taller cone in background) on Tenerife		28°15′18″N 16°40′37″W	
Ring intrusion	Trachyte ring intrusion at Pico de la Muda on Fuerteventura		28°22′59″N 14°05′13″W	
Shield volcano	La Gomera shield volcano (background) viewed from Tenerife		28°08′13″N 17°09′22″W	
Sill	Roque Cinchado in Las Cañadas caldera on Tenerife. Two light-coloured layers in the upper half of this rock pillar are sills.		28°13′29″N 16°37′54″W	
Stratovolcano	Teide on Tenerife		28°16′19″N 16°38′31″W	
Tuff cone	Caldera Blanca in Timanfaya on Lanzarote		29°02′24″N 13°43′44″W	
Tuff ring	Caldera del Rey on Tenerife		28°05′02″N 16°42′50″W	
Volcanic plug	Montaña Tindaya – an eroded trachyte plug on Fuerteventura		28°35′46″N 13°58′34″W	

== Geological hazards ==
=== Volcanic hazards and risk ===
Volcanic hazard is the probability of damaging physical phenomena, produced by a volcano, occurring in a particular area during a particular time interval. The closely associated concept of volcanic risk is an estimate of the human, infrastructural, and other costs and impacts resulting from the occurrence of volcanic hazard, measured against how such impacts may be mitigated.

The entire resident human population of the Canary Islands (approximately 2.26 million in 2025) lives less than 100 km (62 mi) from an active volcano. The islands are also visited by many tourists (approximately 18.39 million in 2025). Potential volcanic hazards in the Canary Islands include lava flows, pyroclastic flows and pyroclastic falls, volcanic gas emissions, lahars, and edifice collapses.

Unlike some other ocean island chains (e.g. the Hawaiian Islands) where active volcanoes are confined to one end of the chain, the active volcanoes of the Canary Islands are located along the entire length of the chain. This wide spatial spread of eruptions makes it more difficult to predict which Canarian island will have the next volcanic eruption.

During historical volcanic eruptions on the Canary Islands, lava flows have not endangered human life directly, but they have destroyed thousands of buildings and destructively covered agricultural land, forestry areas, and roads in the Canary Islands. Pyroclastic airfall material (tephra), including volcanic ash, has also damaged buildings by roof collapse due to excessive ash accumulation on roofs. Volcanic ash deposits and volcanic gas emissions have also hampered clean-up activity during some eruptions.

Although buried molten magma can be detected before an eruption occurs, such magma is known to have migrated horizontally more than 20 km (12 mi) underground in some Canarian historical eruptions and this hampers scientists' ability to forecast where new volcanic vents may form.

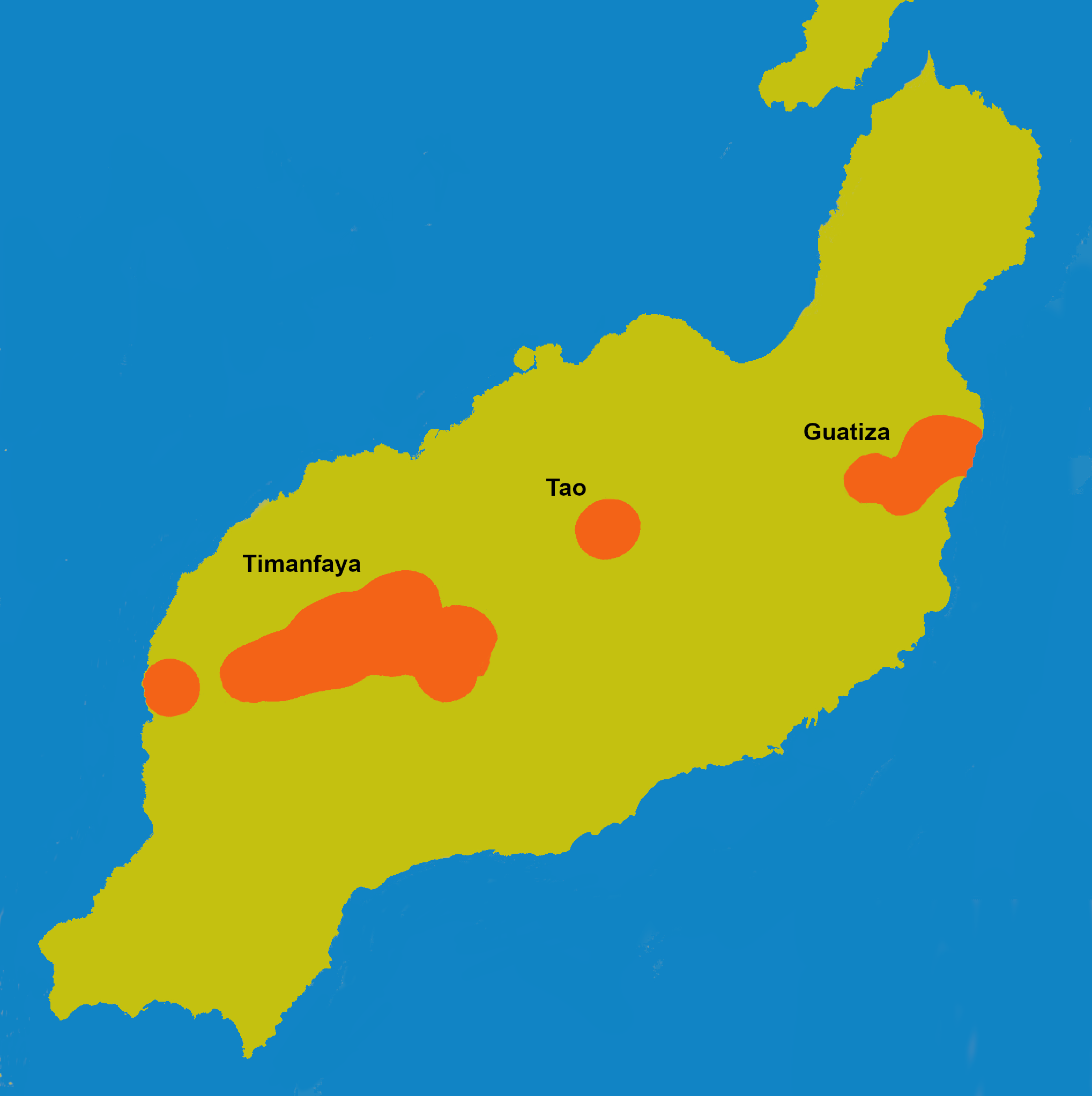
Simplified volcanic susceptibility map of Lanzarote showing the areas (in orange) that have the highest probability of new volcanic vent opening in the future

Geological studies indicate that Lanzarote's next volcanic eruptions are most likely to occur at Timanfaya or at Tao, where eruptions occurred in 1730–1736 and 1824 respectively, or in the Guatiza area where eruptions occurred earlier in the Holocene.

In the last 158,000 years, the most common type of volcanic eruption on El Hierro has been mafic strombolian eruptions at monogenetic vents. This is expected to also be El Hierro's most likely type of volcanic activity in the geologically near future.

On Tenerife, the greatest potential volcanic hazard is probably pyroclastic airfall but the probability of a large pyroclastic eruption on the island is low.

Scientists have concluded that future volcanic eruptions are more likely to occur at the western islands (Tenerife, La Palma, El Hierro). Volcanic hazard and risk assessments have been done for the islands. These assessments have involved study and mapping of volcanic eruption products produced during past eruptions, which give indications of the location, frequency, severity, and probability of eruptions. The completeness of this information varies among the islands. This information has been input into geological computer modelling of hazard and risk for various future volcanic eruption scenarios. Due to the incompleteness of the record of past eruptions, there is considerable uncertainty in the hazard and risk assessments for most of the Canary Islands.

The record of past eruptions is better known on Tenerife and La Palma; scientists therefore have more confidence in the accuracy of the hazard and risk assessments for these islands. La Palma and Tenerife have been assessed as the two Canarian islands facing the greatest volcanic hazards. In a hazard and risk assessment by Brown et al. (2015), these two islands have a volcanic hazard index of II (from a possible range of I, II or III) and a population exposure index (Note: Population exposure index is a measure (from 1 to 7) of the probability of fatalities occurring, during a volcanic eruption, in the total human population that lives less than 100 km (62 mi) from a volcano (based on population distribution and past fatalities).) of 4 (from a range of 1 to 7). These two indices combine to give Tenerife and La Palma a risk level of II (from a possible range of I, II or III). Brown et al. (2015) also concluded that although El Hierro, Gran Canaria, and Fuerteventura have a population exposure index of 4, and Lanzarote has a population exposure index of 5, the volcanic hazard index of these islands is unclassified due to insufficient data; therefore these islands also have an unclassified risk level.

Scandone et al. (2016) ranked the Canary Islands by volcanic risk coefficient as shown in the following table:

Volcanic risk coefficients for the Canary Islands (as of 2016)
Island	Volcanic risk coefficient	Notes
Tenerife	9	highest risk
Gran Canaria	6	
El Hierro	6	
La Palma	5	
Lanzarote	5	
Fuerteventura	3	
La Gomera	0	lowest risk

where volcanic risk coefficient = log(1/years since last eruption) + maximum expected volcanic explosivity index + log(human population).

Historical eruptions in the western islands have been concentrated at active rift zone ridges or central volcanic edifices. These areas, for example the northwest rift zone of Tenerife, are also where the probability of future eruptions occurring is highest.

=== Earthquakes ===
Earthquakes that occur on or near the Canary Islands are linked to volcanism and tectonism: scenarios include underground magma movement in dykes or magma chambers, normal faulting and reverse faulting.

The first local seismometer measurements of earthquakes in the Canary Islands were made in 1891 but it was not until 1952 that the first permanent Canarian earthquake monitoring station was established at Santa Cruz on Tenerife. A network of earthquake monitoring instruments across the island chain was established in 1975; the existence of multiple seismic monitoring stations has enabled accurate location of earthquakes by comparison of seismic wave arrival times at each station (See: Epicentre). As of 2020, the Canary Islands has a network of 70 seismic monitoring stations, making it one of the most closely monitored volcanic regions of the world.

On the Modified Mercalli Scale (an earthquake intensity scale ranging from I for "not felt" to XII for "extreme"), most documented earthquakes in the region have had an intensity of VI or less. The Timanfaya eruptions on Lanzarote in 1730, however, were accompanied by earthquakes with intensities of up to X on the same scale. Earthquakes of intensity VII have occurred on La Palma (1677, 1920), on Gran Canaria (1913), and on Fuerteventua (1915, 1917).

Interactive, zoomable map of earthquakes of magnitude 4.0 or larger in the Canary Islands region 1976–2024 (Data source: USGS Earthquake Catalog)

The seismicity of the Canary Islands is very low to low. The USGS Earthquake Catalog reports that from 1 January 1976 to 31 December 2024, 17 earthquakes of magnitude 4.0 or larger, with epicentres on or close to the Canary Islands, were recorded; the largest of these earthquakes had a m_{b} magnitude of 5.4 and an intensity of VII with its epicentre on the ocean floor about 28 km (17 mi) west of El Hierro in 2013.

Periods of increased seismic unrest occurred on Tenerife in 2004–2005 and 2016–2021. In 2004–2005, an earthquake swarm of about 200 earthquakes occurred along the northwest rift zone of Tenerife. The swarm was probably caused by a movement of molten magma and associated magmatic gases disturbing Teide's hydrothermal system. This raised concern that a volcanic eruption may have been about to occur but no eruption on Tenerife followed the swarm. The seismic unrest of 2016–2021 included more than 400 earthquakes under Teide's volcanic cone and under Las Cañadas caldera, probably due to another intrusion of magma, magma mixing, and injection of magmatic gases into Teide's hydrothermal system. This period of seismic unrest has not been followed by a volcanic eruption on Tenerife.

Earthquake swarms, due to the underground movement of molten magma, were detected before and during the volcanic eruptions of 2011–2012 and 2021. In the week before the 2021 eruption on La Palma, a swarm of more than 22,000 earthquakes occurred, with mb_{Lg} magnitudes up to about 3.5. The hypocentres of successive earthquakes migrated upwards as magma rose slowly to the surface. During the eruption, larger earthquakes were detected, for example an earthquake of mb_{Lg} magnitude 4.3 occurred 35 km (22 mi) below the surface.

In the last 500 years, at least four tsunamis that were triggered by distant earthquakes, have hit the coasts of the Canary Islands. They occurred in 1755 (1755 Lisbon earthquake), 1761 (1761 Lisbon earthquake), 1941 (1941 Gloria Fault earthquake) and 1969.

== Geological resources ==
=== Onshore ===
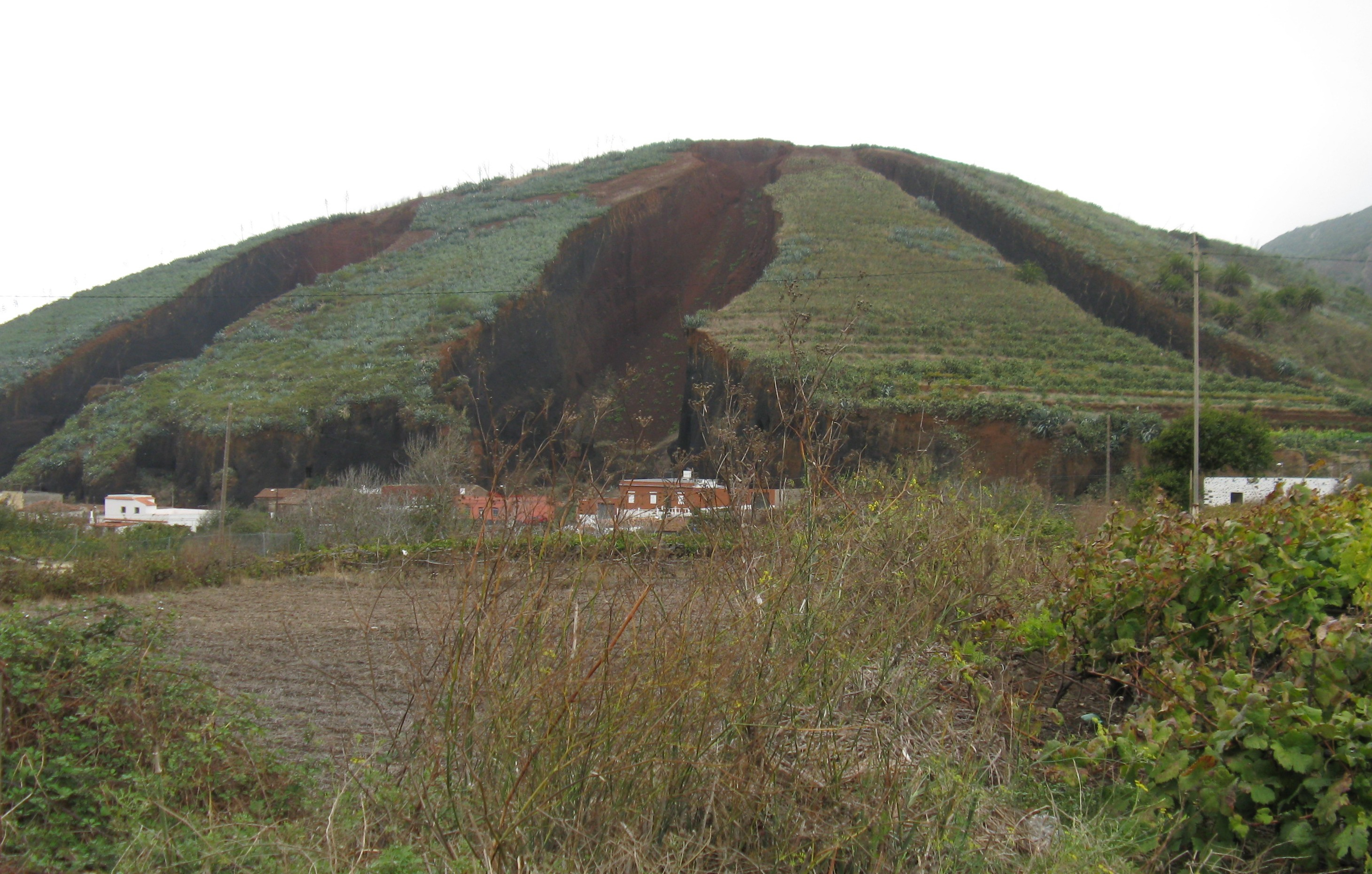
Montaña de El Palmar, Tenerife showing quarried sectors of the volcanic cone

Volcanic rock has been extracted at quarries scattered across the Canary Islands. This includes at some volcanic cones, for example Montaña de El Palmar in northwest Tenerife, where basaltic lapilli tephra (known locally as "picón") has been removed for use as horticultural substrate and road construction aggregate.

Phonolitic and trachytic pyroclastic rocks (including pumice) of intermediate composition have been used as a building material. For example, Bandas del Sur ignimbrite of the Poris Formation has been extracted from quarries at Tajao and at Poris de Abona in southern Tenerife. Similar pyroclastic rock has been extracted from quarries on Gran Canaria and Fuerteventura.

On Gran Canaria, lapilli have been extracted at quarries for use in heat exchangers, and for filters that remove dust from gases.

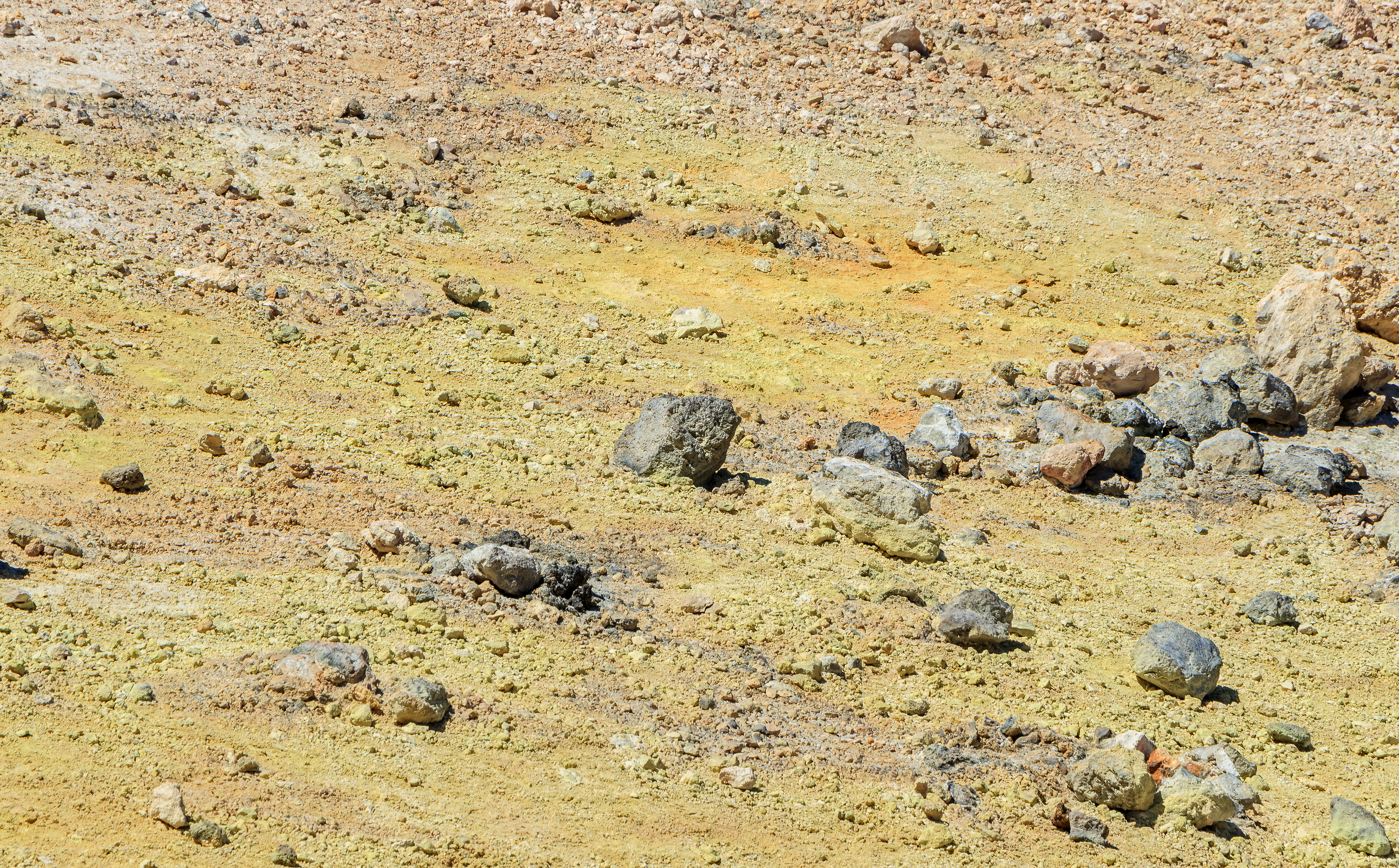
Yellow deposits of sulfur near the summit of Teide, Tenerife

Starting in the first half of the 16th century, on Tenerife, sulfur was extracted from fumarolic areas at Teide's summit. Initially, the extracted sulfur was used as an ingredient in gunpowder. Later, sulfur was used by local farmers to protect their grape crop against diseases. Extraction of sulfur at the volcano continued until the 1940s.

The sedimentary rock calcrete (also known as caliche) was extracted at some quarries in southwestern Gran Canaria, then heated in kilns to produce lime for use in construction. Calrete extraction for lime production also occurred on Fuerteventura.

Deposits of some rare-earth elements have been found in two settings in the Canary Islands: (1) pegmatitic syenites of southwest Tenerife and northeast La Gomera; (2) carbonatites in the Basal Complex of northwest and central Fuerteventura.

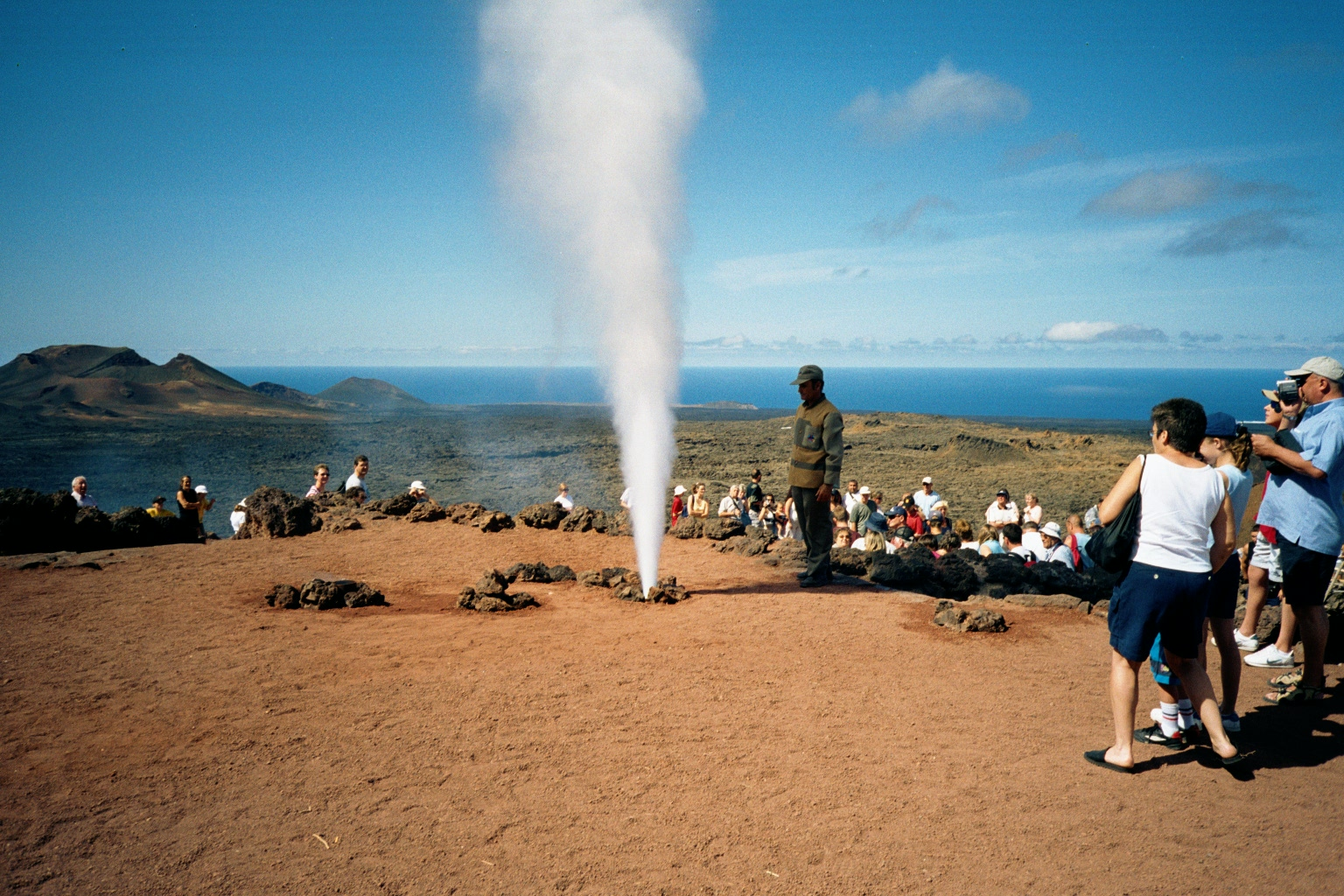
Demonstration, for tourists by National Park staff, of water turned into an artificial steam geyser after being poured down a borehole into hot bedrock at Islote de Hilario, Timanfaya, Lanzarote, 2002

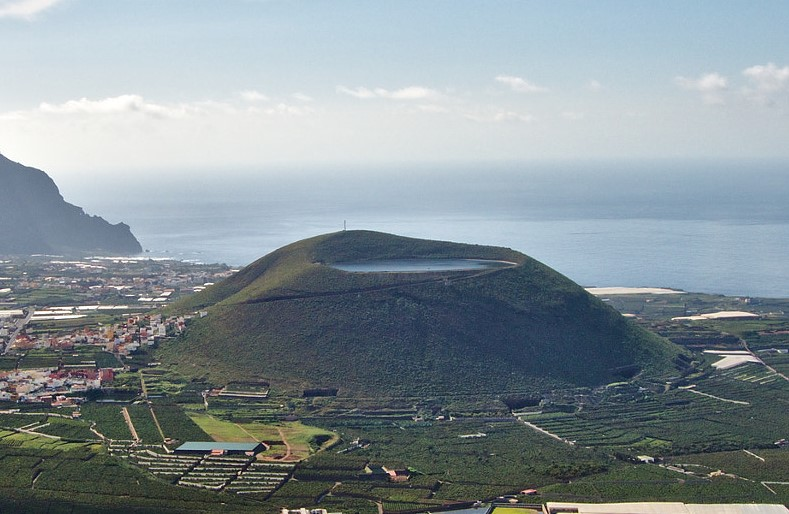
Reservoir in the summit crater of Montaña de Taco, Tenerife

The potential exploitation of shallow high-enthalpy geothermal energy resources has been investigated on Lanzarote, Tenerife and La Palma. The geothermal energy originates from hot volcanic sources in the bedrock. A crater rim surface temperature of 200 °C (392 °F), as well as a borehole temperature of 605 °C (1,121 °F) at a depth of 13 m (43 ft), have been recorded at Timanfaya, Lanzarote. High-enthalpy geothermal energy has been used to heat the water supply of a winery on Lanzarote using a borehole heat exchanger field of twelve boreholes, as part of the Shallow Geothermal Energy for the Canary Islands (SAGE4CAN) project. As of 2023, an experimental project on Lanzarote has been investigating the generation of electricity using the hot dry rock heat source provided by the island's geologically recent volcanic activity at Timanfaya, where installed thermoelectric generators are capable of producing 4.4 MWh of electricity per year.

Reservoirs for fresh water have been built in the craters of some volcanic cones, e.g. Laguna de Barlovento (in northeast La Palma) and Montaña de Taco (in northwest Tenerife).

==== Geotourism ====
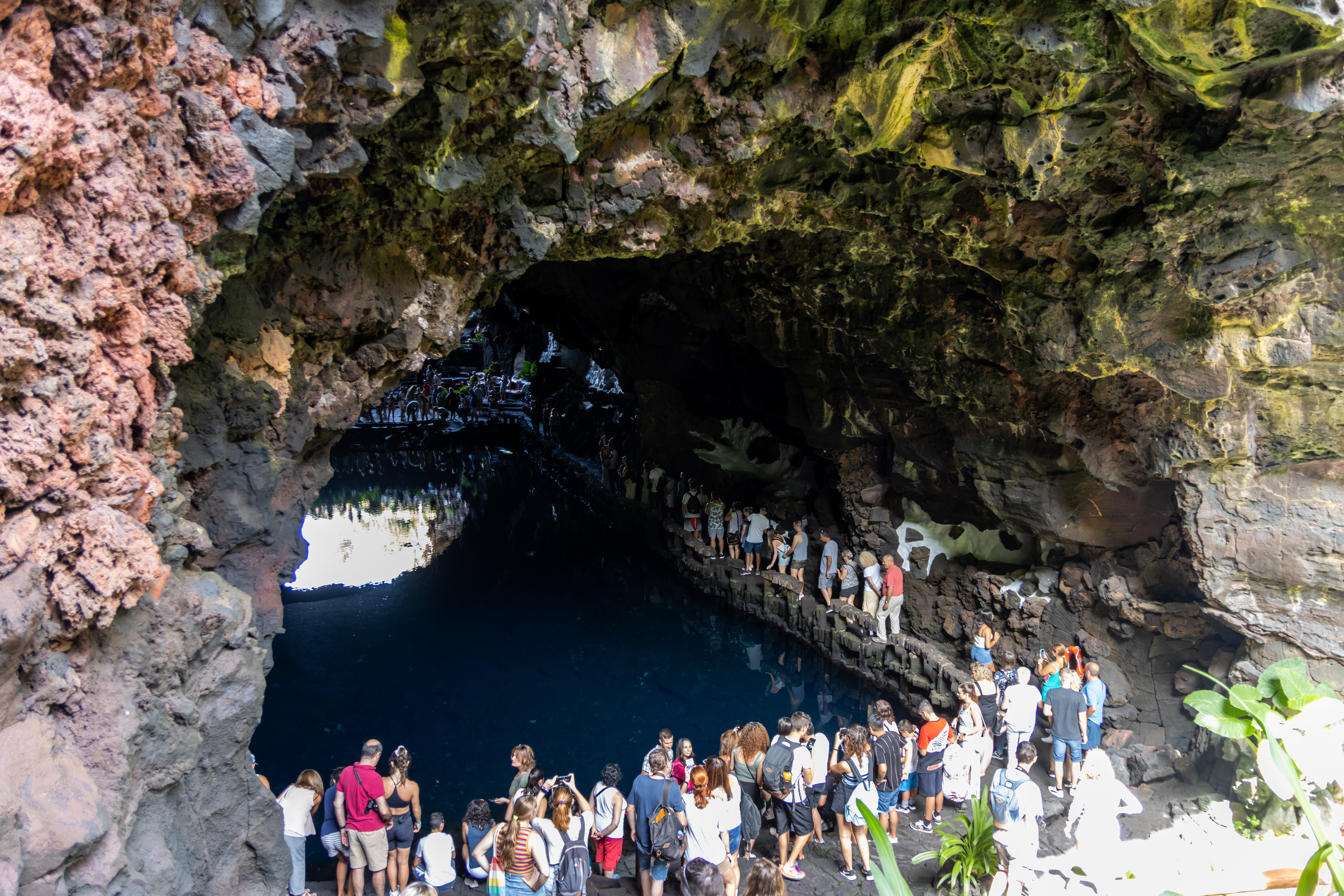
Tourists at Jameos del Agua lava tube on Lanzarote in 2022

The geological features and landscapes of the Canary Islands are sites of geotourism. Many features and sites are protected in a network of national parks, natural parks, rural parks, natural reserves, natural monuments, and sites of scientific interest. Examples are:

Fuerteventura

- Corralejo Natural Park
- Jandía Natural Park

Lanzarote

- Timanfaya National Park
- Los Volcanes Natural Park
- Lanzarote and Chinijo Islands UNESCO Global Geopark
- Jameos del Agua
- Cueva de los Verdes

Gran Canaria

- Tamadaba Natural Park
- Pilancones Natural Park
- Maspalomas Dunes Natural Reserve
- Inagua Natural Reserve
- Roque Nublo Rural Park

Tenerife

- Teide National Park (also a UNESCO World Heritage Site)
- Barranco del Infierno Natural Reserve
- Montaña Roja Special Natural Reserve

La Gomera

- Garajonay National Park (also a UNESCO World Heritage Site)
- Los Roques Natural Monument
- Los Órganos de La Gomera Natural Monument

La Palma

- Caldera de Taburiente National Park

El Hierro

- El Hierro UNESCO Global Geopark
- Frontera Rural Park
- Roques de Salmor Natural Park

English translation of Alexander von Humboldt's book about his 1799 travels including his walk to the summit of Teide

TFGeoturismo is a local government project promoting geotourism in Tenerife. It began in 2017 and is supported by the Cabildo (Island Council) of Tenerife and operated by INVOLCAN, the organisation that oversees various aspects of volcano–human interaction in the Canary Islands. Teide National Park is particularly significant in Tenerife's geotourism strategy because it provides a high-profile opportunity to improve public awareness of Tenerife's volcanic heritage; it is Spain's most visited national park and one of the world's most visited volcanic areas. (In 2016, 2017 and 2018, Teide National Park had more than 4 million visitors per year). TFGeoturismo has promoted Teide National Park by making and screening a documentary film about the park, as well as publishing a guidebook describing and explaining the park's geology, geomorphology and volcano-related natural and cultural heritage. The project has also published a set of urban geotourism guide leaflets for more than 20 municipalities of Tenerife, e.g. Garachico. TFGeoturismo has published a guide promoting the role of Tenerife in the history of science, describing 18 locations along the route of Alexander von Humboldt's 1799 journey from Puerto de la Cruz to the summit of Teide.

Even before tourism became a major part of La Palma's economy, some tourists were attracted to the island due to the 1949 and 1971 volcanic eruptions. Although the 2021 eruption had numerous negative effects for La Palma's resident population, tourists who wanted to see a volcanic eruption visited the island. A survey of 1,026 people who visited La Palma during the 2021 eruption indicated that most of the tourists came from the other Canarian islands and that the erupting volcano had become the island's main tourist attraction, with 64.3% of survey respondents stating that their reason for visiting La Palma was to witness the volcanic eruption. The survey respondents also stated that the most memorable aspects of their volcanic eruption experience were volcanic noise, volcanic ash fall, volcanic gas smells, glowing molten lava (particularly at night), impact on the residents' lives, and damage to personal property.

=== Offshore ===
The sedimentary rocks under the ocean between the eastern islands of the Canarian archipelago and Africa, e.g. rocks in the Fúster Casas Trough, are believed to contain hydrocarbons. Exploration of these resources is underway. As of 2019, one offshore well (Sandia-1) had found petroleum in Tertiary-age sandstone. As of 2020, two offshore exploration wells had found heavy oil but they are not commercially viable.

== Gallery ==
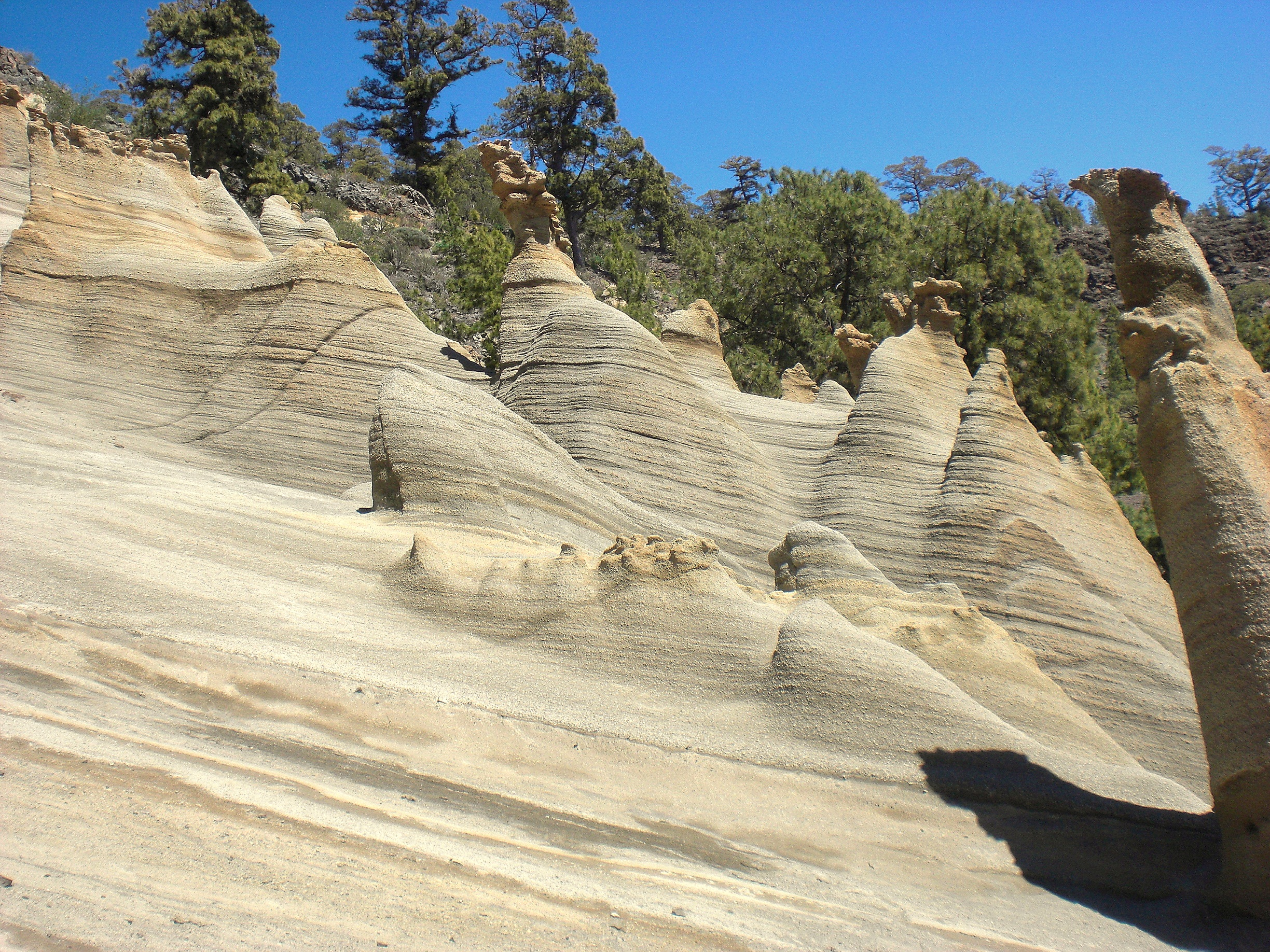
Pillars ("fairy chimneys") of Lower Pleistocene pyroclastic rock at Los Escurriales/Paisaje lunar, near Vilaflor, Tenerife

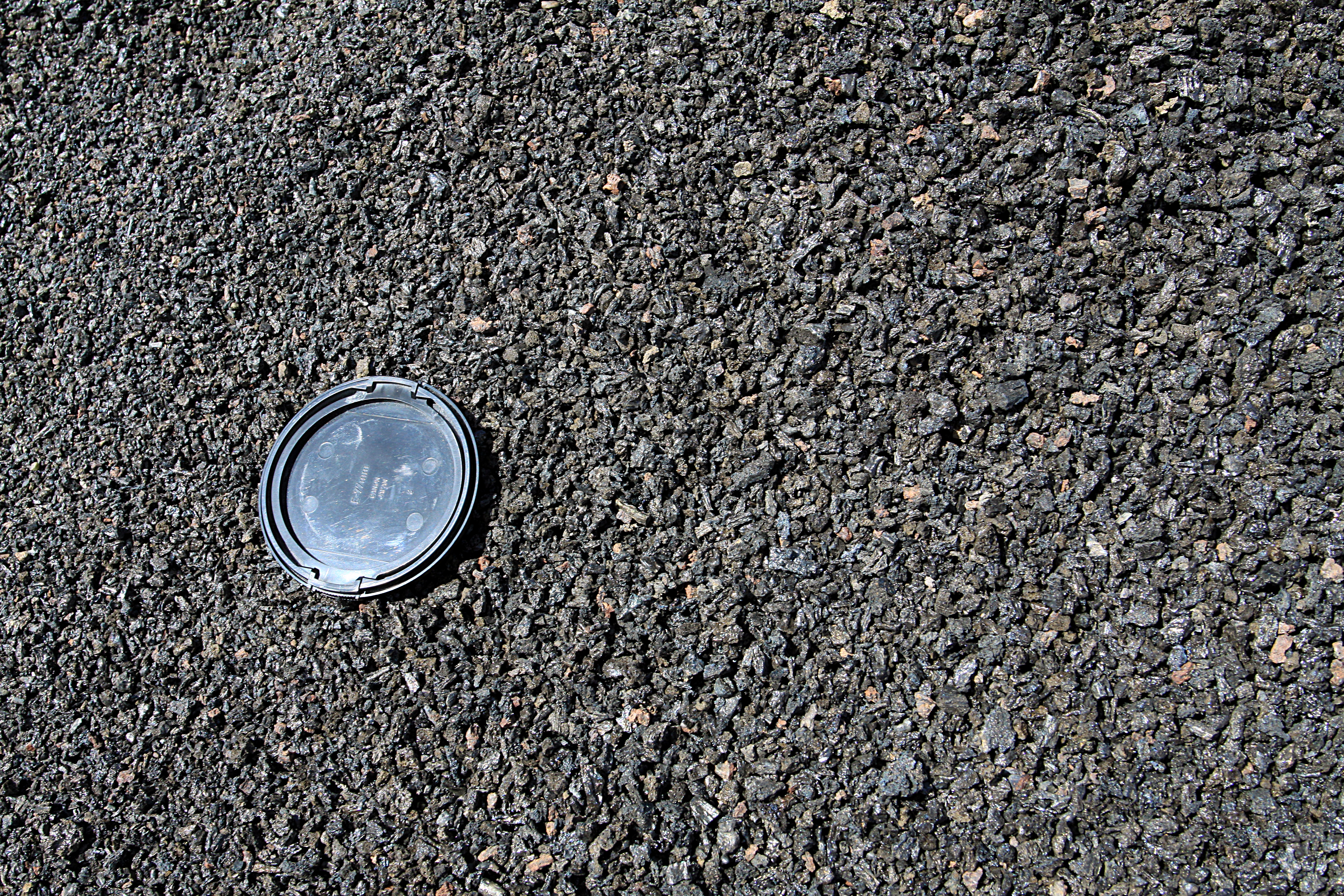
Cinders of the cone of Caldera de los Cuervos on Lanzarote, with camera lens cap (77 mm (3 in) across) for scale

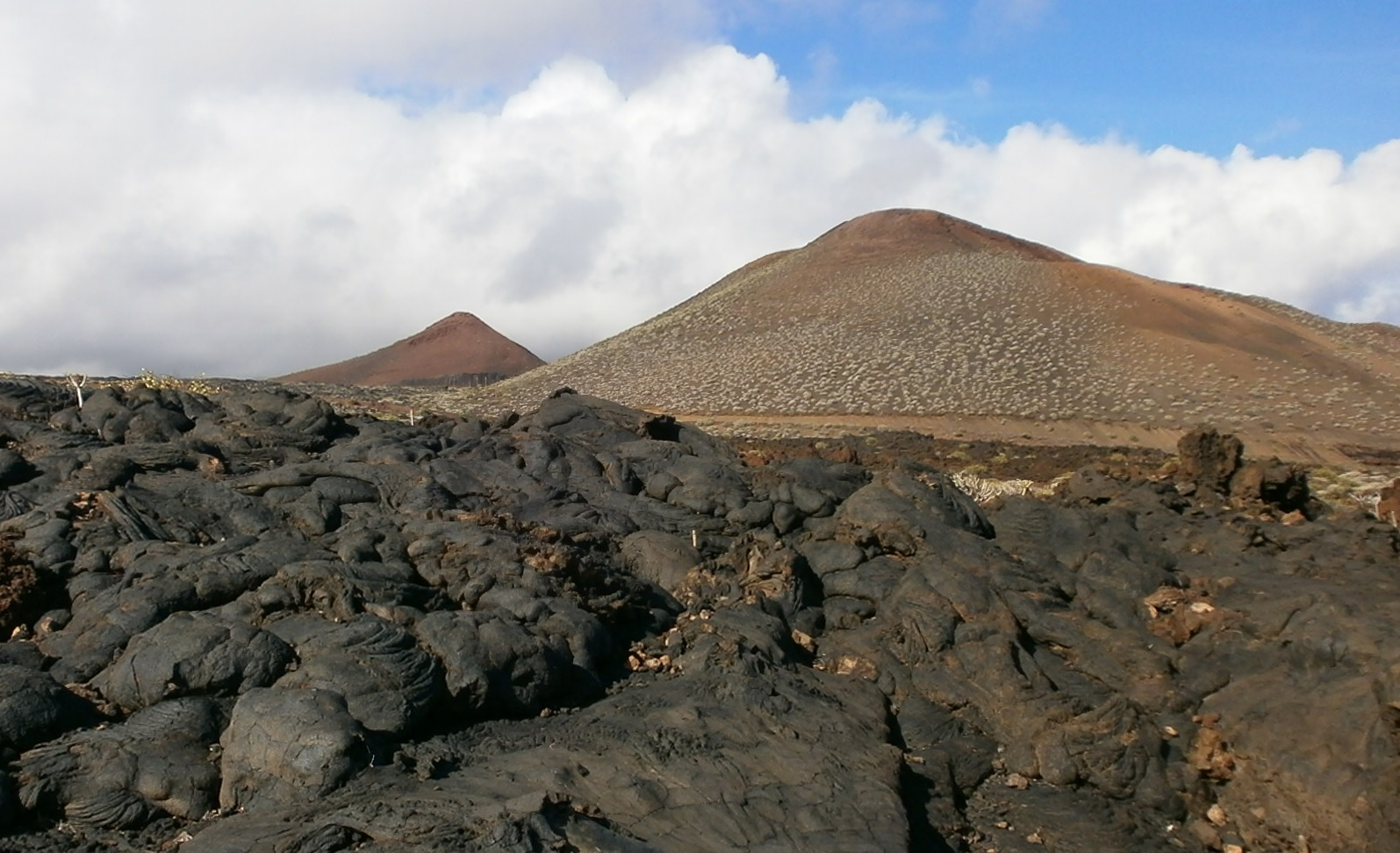
Volcanic cones and pahoehoe lava at La Restinga on El Hierro

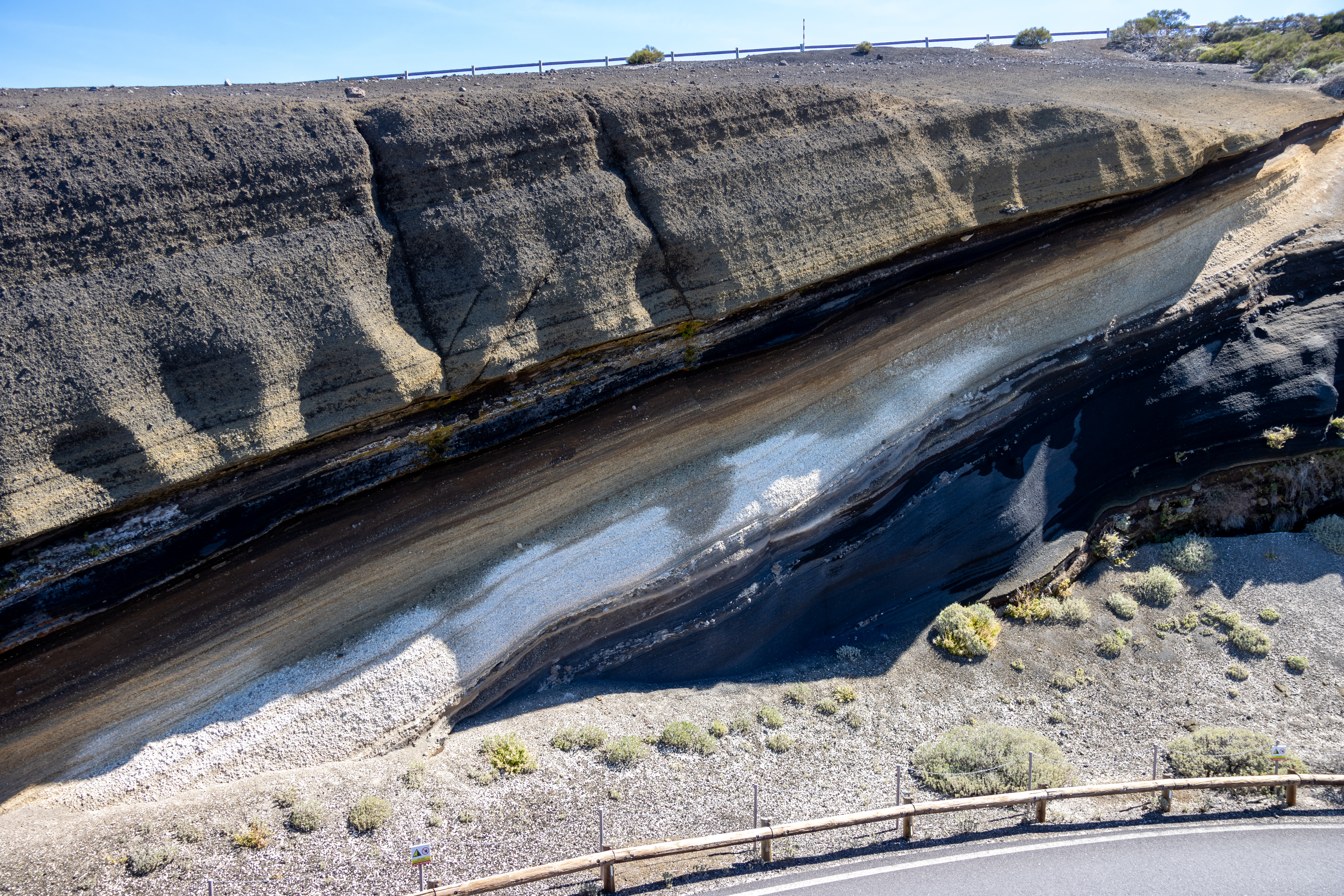
Pyroclastic layers (light-coloured phonolitic pumice and dark-coloured basaltic lapilli) at Curvas del Pastel/La Tarta del Teide on Tenerife (scale: cliff height is approximately 10 m (33 ft))

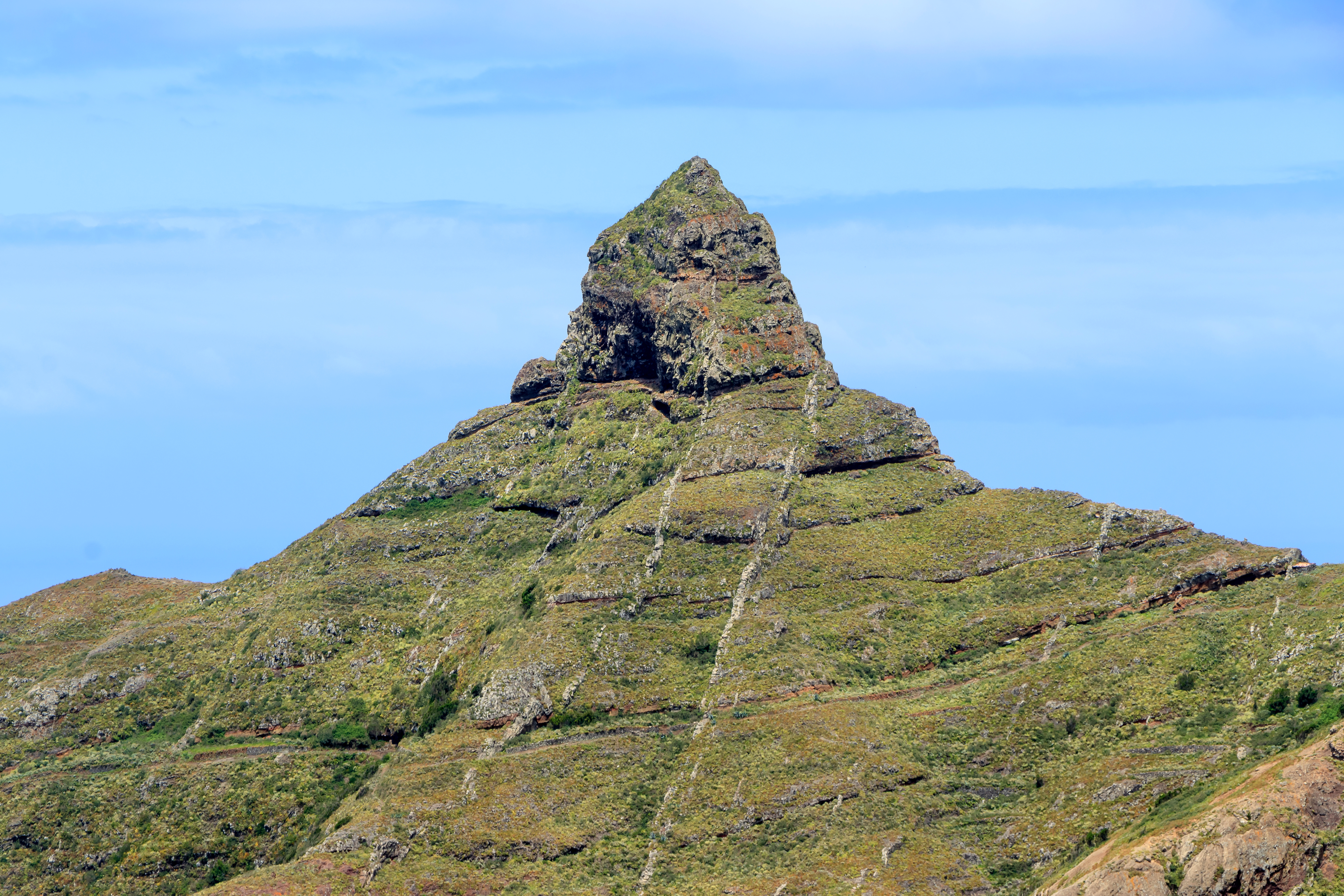
Basaltic lava flows and subordinate pyroclastic rock layers cut by vertical dykes at Roque de Taborno in the Anaga Massif on Tenerife

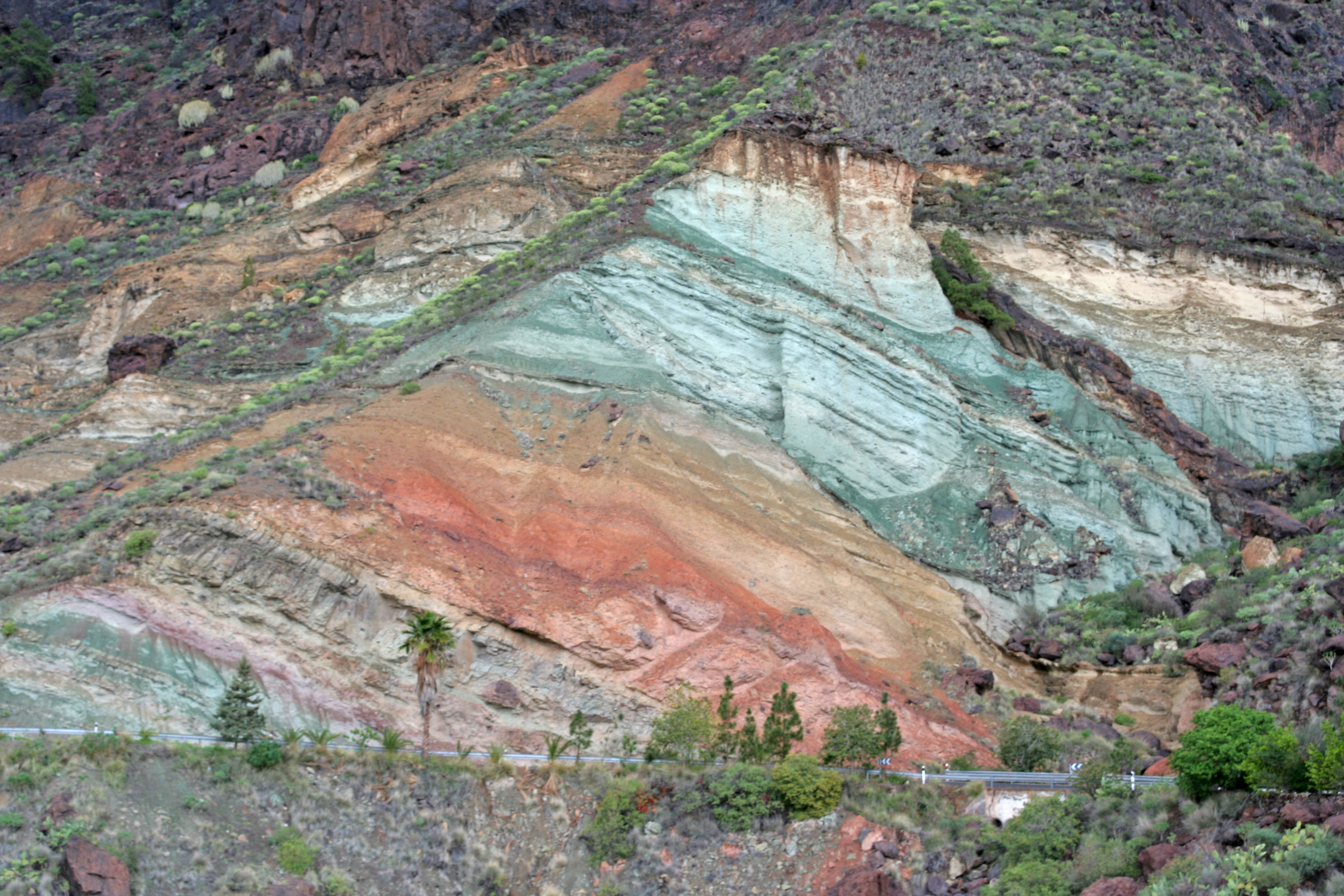
Hydrothermally-altered Miocene intra-caldera tuff layers at Fuente de los Azulejos near Tasarte, Gran Canaria

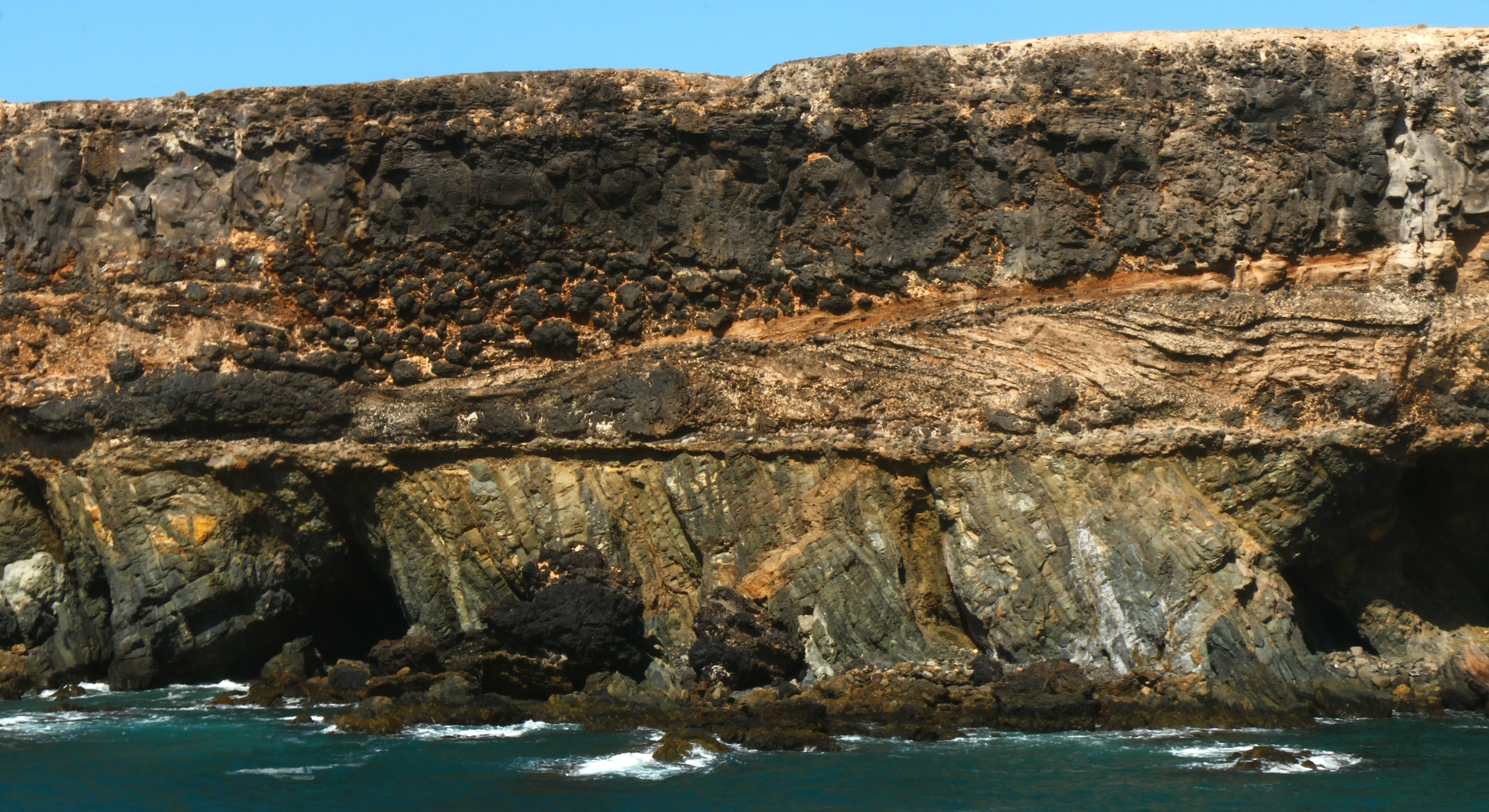
Cliff at Caleta Negra, Ajuy on Fuerteventura. The lower third of the cliff consists of steeply-tilted pre-Miocene oceanic sedimentary rocks. These rocks are unconformably overlain by Pliocene light-coloured cross-bedded beach sedimentary rocks, black pillow lava, and a black lava flow. (Scale: cliff height is approximately 40 m (130 ft))

== See also ==
- Canary Islands Seamount Province – Geographic region of the Canary Islands – a group of seamounts off the coast of northwest Africa
- Geology of Cape Verde - a group of volcanic islands, 1,400 km (870 mi) southwest of the Canary Islands
- Geology of Madeira – a group of volcanic islands, 450 km (280 mi) north of the Canary Islands
- Geology of Morocco – nearby country on the African mainland
- List of Sites of Community Importance in the Canary Islands
- Longshore drift – Sediment moved by the longshore current
- Moganite – Silica mineral, rare monoclinic polymorph of quartz, first found in rocks of the Mogán Formation on Gran Canaria
- Pico do Fogo – Mountain peak in Cape Verde – a stratovolcano in the caldera of an island shield volcano, formed on top of a seamount
