= List of islands of Spain =

This list of islands in Spain encapsulates the country's islands both within its territorial borders and its overseas possessions. The total number of islands is 179.

== List ==
| Country | Sea | Name | Archipelago | Autonomous Community | Province | Municipality | Area | | Population | Density |
| Country | Sea | Name | Archipelago | Autonomous Community | Province | Municipality | km^{2} | sq mi | Population | Density |
|---|---|---|---|---|---|---|---|---|---|---|
| 046 | A-0 | Isla de Ízaro | – | Basque Country | Vizcaya | Bermeo | 0.144 | 0.056 | – | – |
| 0 | A-0 | Garraitz | – | Basque Country | Vizcaya | Lequeitio | 0.065 | 0.025 | – | – |
| 0 | A-0 | Santa Clara | – | Basque Country | Guipúzcoa | San Sebastián | 0.056 | 0.022 | – | – |
| 0 | A-0 | Isla de Aquech | – | Basque Country | Vizcaya | Bermeo | 0.03 | 0.012 | – | – |
| 0 | A-0 | Isla de Txatxarramendi | – | Basque Country | Vizcaya | Pedernales | 0.027 | 0.010 | – | – |
| 0 | A-0 | Isla Villano | – | Basque Country | Vizcaya | Górliz | 0.018 | 0.0069 | – | – |
| 0 | A-0 | Isla de los Faisanes | – | Basque Country | Guipúzcoa (shared with France) | Irún | 0.0078 | 0.0030 | – | – |
| 0 | A-0 | Isla de Zuaza | – | Basque Country | Álava | Arratzua-Ubarrundia | n/d | | – | – |
| 031 | A-0 | Isla de Montehano | – | Cantabria | Cantabria | Escalante | 0.37 | 0.14 | – | – |
| 038 | A-0 | Isla de Santa Marina | – | Cantabria | Cantabria | Ribamontán al Mar | 0.2178 | 0.0841 | – | – |
| 050 | A-0 | Isla de Pedrosa | – | Cantabria | Cantabria | Marina de Cudeyo | 0.104 | 0.040 | – | – |
| 0 | A-0 | Isla de la Virgen del Mar | – | Cantabria | Cantabria | Santander | 0.0795 | 0.0307 | – | – |
| 0 | A-0 | Isla del Castro | – | Cantabria | Cantabria | Santa Cruz de Bezana | 0.0349 | 0.0135 | – | – |
| 0 | A-0 | Isla de San Pedruco | – | Cantabria | Cantabria | Noja | 0.0304 | 0.0117 | – | – |
| 0 | A-0 | Isla de la Oliva | – | Cantabria | Cantabria | Noja | 0.027 | 0.010 | – | – |
| 0 | A-0 | Isla Conejera | – | Cantabria | Cantabria | Suances | 0.023 | 0.0089 | – | – |
| 0 | A-0 | Urros de Liencres | – | Cantabria | Cantabria | Liencres | 0.022 | 0.0085 | – | – |
| 0 | A-0 | Isla Sarnosa | – | Cantabria | Cantabria | Val de San Vicente | 0.02 | 0.0077 | – | – |
| 0 | A-0 | Isla de Mouro | – | Cantabria | Cantabria | Santander | 0.0209 | 0.0081 | – | – |
| 0 | A-0 | Isla del Castril | – | Cantabria | Cantabria | Val de San Vicente | 0.013 | 0.0050 | – | – |
| 0 | A-0 | Isla Solita | – | Cantabria | Cantabria | Miengo | 0.0063 | 0.0024 | – | – |
| 0 | A-0 | Isla de la Torre | – | Cantabria | Cantabria | Santander | 0.005 | 0.0019 | – | – |
| 0 | A-0 | Peñón de Moja el Rabo | – | Cantabria | Cantabria | Noja | 0.004 | 0.0015 | – | – |
| 0 | A-0 | Isla de los Ratones | – | Cantabria | Cantabria | Marina de Cudeyo | 0.002 | 0.00077 | – | – |
| 0 | A-0 | Isla de la Horadada | – | Cantabria | Cantabria | Santander | 0.0015 | 0.00058 | – | – |
| 0 | A-0 | Islote de Ansión | – | Cantabria | Cantabria | Santander | 0.0015 | 0.00058 | – | – |
| 0 | A-0 | Isla Segunda | – | Cantabria | Cantabria | Miengo | 0.00124 | 0.00048 | – | – |
| 0 | A-0 | Isla Casilda | – | Cantabria | Cantabria | Miengo | 0.001 | 0.00039 | – | – |
| 0 | A-0 | Islote d Neptuno Niño | – | Cantabria | Cantabria | Santander | n/d | | – | – |
| 0 | A-0 | Oriñón | – | Cantabria | Cantabria | Castro Urdiales | n/d | | – | – |
| 0 | A-0 | Castro | – | Cantabria | Cantabria | Noja | n/d | | – | – |
| 0 | A-0 | Cuarezo | – | Cantabria | Cantabria | Noja | n/d | | – | – |
| 0 | A-0 | Llera | – | Cantabria | Cantabria | Noja | n/d | | – | – |
| 0 | A-0 | Águila | – | Cantabria | Cantabria | Noja | n/d | | – | – |
| 0 | A-0 | Suaces | – | Cantabria | Cantabria | Noja | n/d | | – | – |
| 0 | A-0 | Garfanta | – | Cantabria | Cantabria | Noja | n/d | | – | – |
| 0 | A-0 | Isla de la Hierba | – | Cantabria | Cantabria | Elechas | n/d | | – | – |
| 0 | A-0 | La Campanuca | – | Cantabria | Cantabria | Elechas | n/d | | – | – |
| 0 | A-0 | Isla de La Deva y Playón de Bayas | – | Asturias | Asturias | Castrillón | 0.07 | 0.027 | – | – |
| 0 | A-0 | Pantorgas | – | Asturias | Asturias | Tapia de Casariego | 0.069 | 0.027 | – | – |
| 0 | A-0 | Islas de Póo | – | Asturias | Asturias | Llanes | 0.052 | 0.020 | – | – |
| 0 | A-0 | Isla Herbosa | – | Asturias | Asturias | Gozón | 0.042 | 0.016 | – | – |
| 0 | A-0 | Isla del Castrón de Santiuste | – | Asturias | Asturias | Llanes | 0.03 | 0.012 | – | – |
| 0 | A-0 | Isla del Forcón | – | Asturias | Asturias | El Franco | 0.028 | 0.011 | – | – |
| 0 | A-0 | Isla de Borizo | – | Asturias | Asturias | Llanes | 0.028 | 0.011 | – | – |
| 0 | A-0 | Isla del Carmen | – | Asturias | Asturias | Gozón | 0.022 | 0.0085 | – | – |
| 0 | A-0 | La Islona | – | Asturias | Asturias | Llanes | 0.021 | 0.0081 | – | – |
| 0 | A-0 | Isla de Tapia | – | Asturias | Asturias | Tapia de Casariego | 0.02 | 0.0077 | – | – |
| 0 | A-0 | Isla de Veiga | – | Asturias | Asturias | Navia | 0.02 | 0.0077 | – | – |
| 0 | A-0 | Isla Ballota | – | Asturias | Asturias | Llanes | 0.011 | 0.0042 | – | – |
| 015 | A-0 | Illa de Arousa | – | Galicia | Pontevedra | A Illa de Arousa | 6.32 | 2.44 | 4,958 | – |
| 018 | A-0 | Islas Cíes | – | Galicia | Pontevedra | Vigo | 4.34 | 1.68 | 3 | – |
| 019 | A-0 | Ons | – | Galicia | Pontevedra | Bueu | 4.14 | 1.60 | 81 | – |
| 021 | A-0 | Isla de Sálvora | – | Galicia | A Coruña | Ribeira | 1.88 | 0.73 | – | – |
| 024 | A-0 | Isla de La Toja | – | Galicia | Pontevedra | O Grove | 1.10 | 0.42 | 47 | – |
| 049 | A-0 | Isla de Toralla | – | Galicia | Pontevedra | Vigo | 0.106 | 0.041 | 135 | – |
| 026 | A-0 | Islas Sisargas | – | Galicia | A Coruña | Malpica de Bergantiños | 0.68 | 0.26 | – | – |
| 028 | A-0 | Isla de Cortegada | – | Galicia | Pontevedra | Vilagarcía de Arousa | 0.54 | 0.21 | – | – |
| 033 | A-0 | Isla de Onza | – | Galicia | Pontevedra | Bueu | 0.32 | 0.12 | – | – |
| 035 | A-0 | Isla de Tambo | – | Galicia | Pontevedra | Poio | 0.28 | 0.11 | – | – |
| 039 | A-0 | Islas Estelas | – | Galicia | Pontevedra | Nigrán | 0.19 | 0.073 | – | – |
| 043 | A-0 | Isla Coelleira | – | Galicia | Lugo | O Vicedo | 0.16 | 0.062 | – | – |
| 044 | A-0 | Isla de Tourís Novo | – | Galicia | Pontevedra | O Grove | 0.15 | 0.058 | – | – |
| 045 | A-0 | Islas de San Pedro | – | Galicia | A Coruña | A Coruña | 0.15 | 0.058 | – | – |
| 047 | A-0 | Islas Sagres | – | Galicia | A Coruña | Ribeira | 0.135 | 0.052 | – | – |
| 048 | A-0 | Isla de Vionta | – | Galicia | A Coruña | Ribeira | 0.115 | 0.044 | – | – |
| 051 | A-0 | Isla de Toralla | – | Galicia | Pontevedra | Vigo | 0.1 | 0.039 | – | – |
| 050 | A-0 | Isla da Marma | – | Galicia | Pontevedra | Sanxenxo | 0.10 | 0.039 | – | – |
| 050 | A-0 | Isla de La Toja Pequeña | – | Galicia | Pontevedra | Cambados | 0.10 | 0.039 | – | – |
| 050 | A-0 | Isla Ansarón | – | Galicia | Lugo | Xove | 0.10 | 0.039 | – | – |
| 0 | A-0 | Isla Guidoiro Areoso | – | Galicia | Pontevedra | A Illa de Arousa | 0.09 | 0.035 | – | – |
| 0 | A-0 | Isla de A Creba | – | Galicia | A Coruña | Muros | 0.075 | 0.029 | – | – |
| 0 | A-0 | Lobeiras | – | Galicia | A Coruña | Carnota | 0.07 | 0.027 | – | – |
| 0 | A-0 | Centoleiras | – | Galicia | A Coruña | Ribeira | 0.065 | 0.025 | – | – |
| 0 | A-0 | Beiro | – | Galicia | Pontevedra | Cambados | 0.06 | 0.023 | – | – |
| 0 | A-0 | Farallóns | – | Galicia | Lugo | Cervo | 0.06 | 0.023 | – | – |
| 0 | A-0 | Guidoiro Pedregoso | – | Galicia | Pontevedra | A Illa de Arousa | 0.056 | 0.022 | – | – |
| 0 | A-0 | Malveiras | – | Galicia | Pontevedra | Vilagarcía de Arousa | 0.055 | 0.021 | – | – |
| 0 | A-0 | Isla de Os Forcados | – | Galicia | A Coruña | Carnota | 0.05 | 0.019 | – | – |
| 0 | A-0 | Isla de Santa Comba | – | Galicia | A Coruña | Ferrol | 0.05 | 0.019 | – | – |
| 0 | A-0 | Isla de Noro | – | Galicia | A Coruña | Ribeira | 0.04 | 0.015 | – | – |
| 0 | A-0 | Islas Briñas | – | Galicia | Pontevedra | Vilagarcía de Arousa | 0.04 | 0.015 | – | – |
| 0 | A-0 | Isla de La Rúa | – | Galicia | A Coruña | Ribeira | 0.04 | 0.015 | – | – |
| 0 | A-0 | Isla de San Simón | – | Galicia | Pontevedra | Redondela | 0.03 | 0.012 | – | – |
| 0 | A-0 | Isla de Area | – | Galicia | Lugo | Viveiro | 0.03 | 0.012 | – | – |
| 0 | A-0 | Isla de Pombeiro | – | Galicia | Pontevedra | O Grove | 0.02 | 0.0077 | – | – |
| 0 | A-0 | Isla de Santa Cruz | – | Galicia | A Coruña | Oleiros | 0.019 | 0.0073 | – | – |
| 0 | A-0 | Isla del Penedo da Ínsua | – | Galicia | Lugo | Ribadeo | 0.019 | 0.0073 | – | – |
| 0 | A-0 | Isla Herbosa | – | Galicia | A Coruña | Ribeira | 0.016 | 0.0062 | – | – |
| 0 | A-0 | San Clemente | – | Galicia | Pontevedra | Marín | 0.014 | 0.0054 | – | – |
| 0 | A-0 | Isla de San Vicente | – | Galicia | A Coruña | Ortigueira | 0.013 | 0.0050 | – | – |
| 0 | A-0 | San Antón (Pontevedra) | – | Galicia | Pontevedra | Redondela | 0.012 | 0.0046 | – | – |
| 0 | A-0 | San Antón (La Coruña) | – | Galicia | A Coruña | A Coruña | 0.011 | 0.0042 | – | – |
| 0 | A-0 | Pancha | – | Galicia | Lugo | Ribadeo | 0.011 | 0.0042 | – | – |
| 0 | A-0 | Gavoteira | – | Galicia | A Coruña | Ribeira | 0.011 | 0.0042 | – | – |
| 0 | M-0 | Isla de Santa Catalina | – | Ceuta | Ceuta | Ceuta | 0.001 | 0.00039 | – | – |
| 0 | A-0 | Isla Canela | – | Andalusia | Huelva | Ayamonte | 1.5 | 0.58 | 1,213 | – |
| 0 | | Isla de La Gaviota | – | Andalusia | Huelva | Isla Cristina | n/d | | – | – |
| 0 | A-0 | Isla de Saltés | – | Andalusia | Huelva | Huelva | n/d | | – | – |
| 0 | A-0 | Isla Mayor | – | Andalusia | Sevilla | Isla Mayor | n/d | | – | – |
| 0 | A-0 | Isla de Las Palomas | – | Andalusia | Cádiz | Tarifa | n/d | | – | – |
| 0 | A-0 | Isla de León | – | Andalusia | Cádiz | San Fernando | n/d | | – | – |
| 016 | A-0 | Isla del Trocadero | – | Andalusia | Cádiz | Puerto Real | 5.24 | 2.02 | – | – |
| 0 | A-0 | Islote de Sancti Petri | – | Andalusia | Cádiz | San Fernando | 0.097 | 0.037 | – | – |
| 0 | M-0 | Isla de San Andrés | – | Andalusia | Almería | Carboneras | 0.0703 | 0.0271 | – | – |
| 0 | M-0 | Isla de Terreros | – | Andalusia | Almería | Pulpí | 0.0111 | 0.0043 | – | – |
| 0 | M-0 | Isla Negra | – | Andalusia | Almería | Pulpí | 0.006 | 0.0023 | – | – |
| 0 | M-0 | Isla de Alborán | – | Andalusia | Almería | Almería | 0.068 | 0.026 | – | – |
| 0 | A-0 | Isla de San Sebastián | – | Andalusia | Cádiz | Cádiz | 0.045 | 0.017 | – | – |
| 0 | A-0 | Piedra Salmedina | – | Andalusia | Cádiz | Chipiona | 0.0008 | 0.00031 | – | – |
| 0 | A-0 | Isla Piedra del Hombre | – | Andalusia | Cádiz | San Roque | 0.0002 | 7.7×10^{−5} | – | – |
| 025 | M-0 | Isla Mayor | – | Murcia | Región de Murcia | San Javier | 0.938 | 0.362 | – | – |
| 036 | M-0 | Isla Perdiguera | – | Murcia | Región de Murcia | San Javier | 0.258 | 0.100 | – | – |
| 041 | M-0 | Isla Grosa | – | Murcia | Región de Murcia | San Javier | 0.165 | 0.064 | – | – |
| 042 | M-0 | Isla del Ciervo | – | Murcia | Región de Murcia | Cartagena | 0.163 | 0.063 | – | – |
| 0 | M-0 | Isla del Fraile | – | Murcia | Región de Murcia | Águilas | 0.063 | 0.024 | – | – |
| 0 | M-0 | Isla de Mazarrón | – | Murcia | Región de Murcia | Mazarrón | 0.08 | 0.031 | – | – |
| 0 | M-0 | Isla de Escombreras | – | Murcia | Región de Murcia | Cartagena | 0.04 | 0.015 | – | – |
| 0 | M-0 | Isla del Sujeto | – | Murcia | Región de Murcia | Cartagena | 0.024 | 0.0093 | – | – |
| 0 | M-0 | Isla Rondella | – | Murcia | Región de Murcia | Cartagena | 0.022 | 0.0085 | – | – |
| 0 | M-0 | Isla de Las Palomas | – | Murcia | Región de Murcia | Cartagena | 0.012 | 0.0046 | – | – |
| 0 | M-0 | Isla Plana | – | Murcia | Región de Murcia | Cartagena | 0.01 | 0.0039 | – | – |
| 030 | M-0 | Isla de Tabarca | – | Valencian Community | Alicante | Alicante | 0.403 | 0.156 | 203 | – |
| 040 | M-0 | Islas Columbretes | – | Valencian Community | Castellón | Castellón de la Plana | 0.19 | 0.073 | – | – |
| 0 | M-0 | Isla de Benidorm | – | Valencian Community | Alicante | Benidorm | 0.072 | 0.028 | – | – |
| 0 | M-0 | Portichol | – | Valencian Community | Alicante | Jávea | 0.083 | 0.032 | – | – |
| 0 | M-0 | Descubridor | – | Valencian Community | Alicante | Jávea | 0.025 | 0.0097 | – | – |
| 037 | M-0 | Medas | – | Catalonia | Gerona | L'Estartit | 0.22 | 0.085 | – | – |
| 0 | M-0 | Port Lligat | – | Catalonia | Gerona | Cadaqués | 0.084 | 0.032 | – | – |
| 0 | M-0 | Encalladora | – | Catalonia | Gerona | Cadaqués | 0.055 | 0.021 | – | – |
| 0 | M-0 | Isla de S'Arenella | – | Catalonia | Gerona | Cadaqués | 0.025 | 0.0097 | – | – |
| 0 | M-0 | Isla del Castellar | – | Catalonia | Gerona | Llançá | 0.022 | 0.0085 | – | – |
| 0 | M-0 | Islas Formigues | – | Catalonia | Gerona | Palamós | 0.018 | 0.0069 | – | – |
| 0 | M-0 | Isla de Buda | – | Catalonia | Tarragona | Sant Jaume d'Enveja | 10 | 3.9 | 4 | – |
| 0 | M-0 | Isla de Gracia | – | Catalonia | Tarragona | Deltebre | 1.3 | 0.50 | – | – |
| 0 | M-0 | Isla Massa d'Or | – | Catalonia | Gerona | Cadaqués | 0.007 | 0.0027 | – | – |
| 001 | M-0 | Mallorca | – | Balearic Islands | Islas Baleares | – | 3,620.42 | 1,397.85 | 896,038 | – |
| 007 | M-0 | Menorca | – | Balearic Islands | Islas Baleares | – | 694.39 | 268.11 | 93,397 | – |
| 008 | M-0 | Ibiza | – | Balearic Islands | Islas Baleares | – | 571.04 | 220.48 | 147,914 | – |
| 011 | M-0 | Formentera | – | Balearic Islands | Islas Baleares | Formentera | 83.20 | 32.12 | 12,111 | – |
| 013 | M-0 | Cabrera | – | Balearic Islands | Islas Baleares | Palma de Mallorca | 11.53 | 4.45 | | – |
| 020 | M-0 | Isla Dragonera | – | Balearic Islands | Islas Baleares | Andraitx | 2.52 | 0.97 | – | – |
| 023 | M-0 | Isla de Espalmador | – | Balearic Islands | Islas Baleares | Formentera | 1.37 | 0.53 | – | – |
| 023 | M-0 | S'Illot | – | Balearic Islands | Islas Baleares | Alcúdia | n/d | | – | – |
| 027 | M-0 | Isla de Colom | – | Balearic Islands | Islas Baleares | Mahón | 0.58 | 0.22 | – | – |
| 032 | M-0 | Isla del Aire | – | Balearic Islands | Islas Baleares | San Luís | 0.34 | 0.13 | – | – |
| 0 | M-0 | Isla del Rey | – | Balearic Islands | Islas Baleares | Mahón | 0.044 | 0.017 | – | – |
| 0 | M-0 | Isla de Tosqueta | – | Balearic Islands | Islas Baleares | Mercadal | 0.005 | 0.0019 | – | – |
| 0 | M-0 | Islote de Binicodrell | – | Balearic Islands | Islas Baleares | Es Migjorn | 0.004 | 0.0015 | – | – |
| 0 | M-0 | Isla de Tagomago | – | Balearic Islands | Islas Baleares | Santa Eulalia del Río | 0.4 | 0.15 | – | – |
| 0 | M-0 | Isla de Es Vedrá | – | Balearic Islands | Islas Baleares | Sant Josep | 0.6 | 0.23 | – | – |
| 0 | | Islote de Mel | – | Balearic Islands | Islas Baleares | Mahón | 0.0024 | 0.00093 | – | – |
| 0 | M-0 | Illot des Porros | – | Balearic Islands | Islas Baleares | Santa Margarita | 0.00305 | 0.00118 | – | – |
| 0 | M-0 | Isla Sargantana | – | Balearic Islands | Islas Baleares | Es Mercadal | 0.025 | 0.0097 | – | – |
| 002 | A-0 | Tenerife | – | Canary Islands | Santa Cruz de Tenerife | – | 2,034.38 | 785.48 | 966,354 | – |
| 003 | A-0 | Fuerteventura | – | Canary Islands | Las Palmas | – | 1,659.74 | 640.83 | 126,227 | – |
| 004 | A-0 | Gran Canaria | – | Canary Islands | Las Palmas | – | 1,560.10 | 602.36 | 870,595 | – |
| 005 | A-0 | Lanzarote | – | Canary Islands | Las Palmas | – | 845.94 | 326.62 | 154,530 | – |
| 006 | A-0 | La Palma | – | Canary Islands | Santa Cruz de Tenerife | – | 708.32 | 273.48 | 85,840 | – |
| 009 | A-0 | La Gomera | – | Canary Islands | Santa Cruz de Tenerife | – | 369.76 | 142.77 | 22,426 | – |
| 010 | A-0 | El Hierro | – | Canary Islands | Santa Cruz de Tenerife | – | 268.71 | 103.75 | 11,338 | – |
| 012 | A-0 | La Graciosa | – | Canary Islands | Las Palmas | Teguise | 29.00 | 11.20 | 734 | – |
| 014 | A-0 | Alegranza | – | Canary Islands | Las Palmas | Teguise | 10.30 | 3.98 | – | – |
| 017 | A-0 | Lobos | – | Canary Islands | Las Palmas | La Oliva | 4.50 | 1.74 | 4 | – |
| 022 | A-0 | Montaña Clara | – | Canary Islands | Las Palmas | Teguise | 1.48 | 0.57 | – | – |
| 050 | A-0 | Roques de Anaga | – | Canary Islands | Santa Cruz de Tenerife | Santa Cruz de Tenerife | 0.100 | 0.039 | – | – |
| 0 | A-0 | Roque de Garachico | – | Canary Islands | Santa Cruz de Tenerife | Garachico | 0.050 | 0.019 | – | – |
| 0 | A-0 | Roque del Este | – | Canary Islands | Las Palmas | Teguise | 0.045 | 0.017 | – | – |
| 0 | A-0 | Roques de Salmor | – | Canary Islands | Santa Cruz de Tenerife | Frontera y Valverde | 0.035 | 0.014 | – | – |
| 0 | A-0 | Roque del Oeste | – | Canary Islands | Las Palmas | Teguise | 0.021 | 0.0081 | – | – |
| 0 | A-0 | Roque de Santo Domingo | – | Canary Islands | Santa Cruz de Tenerife | Garafía | n/d | | – | – |
| 0 | A-0 | Islote de Fermina | – | Canary Islands | Las Palmas | Arrecife | n/d | | – | – |
| 0 | A-0 | Islote de Cruces | – | Canary Islands | Las Palmas | Arrecife | n/d | | – | – |
| 0 | | Isla de Valdecañas | – | Extremadura | Cáceres | El Gordo | 1.34 | 0.52 | - | – |
| 0 | | Isla del Burguillo | – | Castile and León | Ávila | El Barraco | n/d | | – | – |
| 0 | | Isla la Centinela | – | Castile and León | Ávila | El Barraco | 0.01 | 0.0039 | – | – |
| 029 | M-0 | Islas Chafarinas | – | Plaza de Soberanía | Ninguna | Ninguno | 0.52 | 0.20 | – | – |
| 034 | M-0 | Islas Alhucemas | – | Plaza de Soberanía | Ninguna | Ninguno | 0.30 | 0.12 | – | – |
| 034 | A-0 | Isla de Perejil | – | Plaza de Soberanía | Ninguna | Ninguno | 0.30 | 0.12 | – | – |

== Spanish Micronesia ==
Spain owned several Pacific islands as part of the Spanish East Indies. After its defeat in the Spanish–American War of 1898, it lost the Philippines. The German–Spanish Treaty (1899) sold the Carolinas, Marianas and Palau to the German Empire. In 1948, Emilio Pastor Santos of the Spanish National Research Council found that the charts and maps up to 1899 had shown that Kapingamarangi and a few other islands had never been considered part of the Caroline Islands, were not included in the description of the territory transferred to Germany and were never ceded by Spain; therefore, Spain would retain sovereignty. In 2014, the Spanish government closed any speculation on the issue of its possession in the Pacific with an answer in the Congress to the deputy Jon Iñarritu. According to its interpretation, Spain yielded in 1899 every remaining possession in the Pacific.
