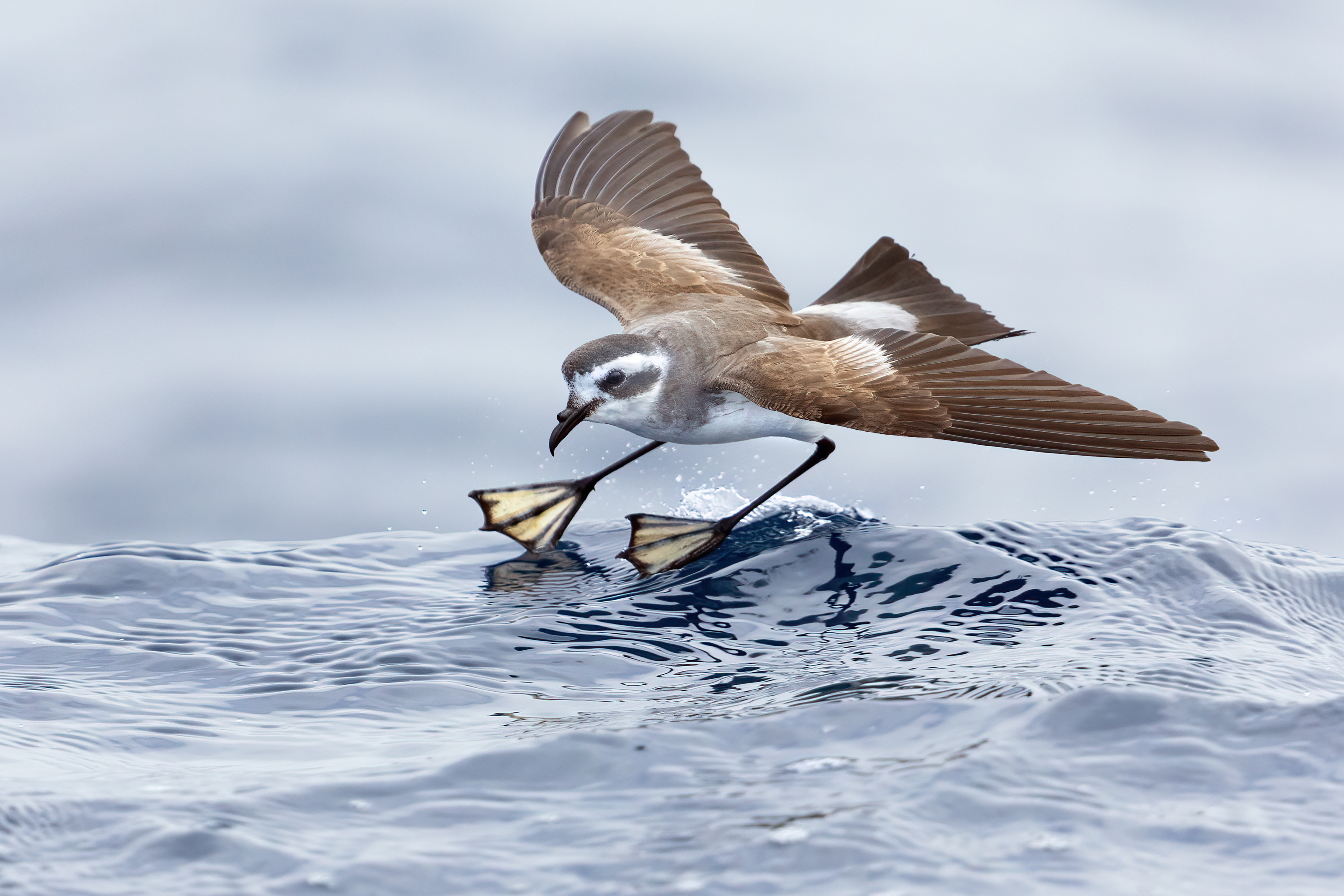

Conservation status
- Least Concern (IUCN 3.1)

Scientific classification
- Kingdom: Animalia
- Phylum: Chordata
- Class: Aves
- Order: Procellariiformes
- Family: Oceanitidae
- Genus: Pelagodroma; Reichenbach, 1853
- Species: P. marina

Binomial name
- Pelagodroma marina (Latham, 1790)
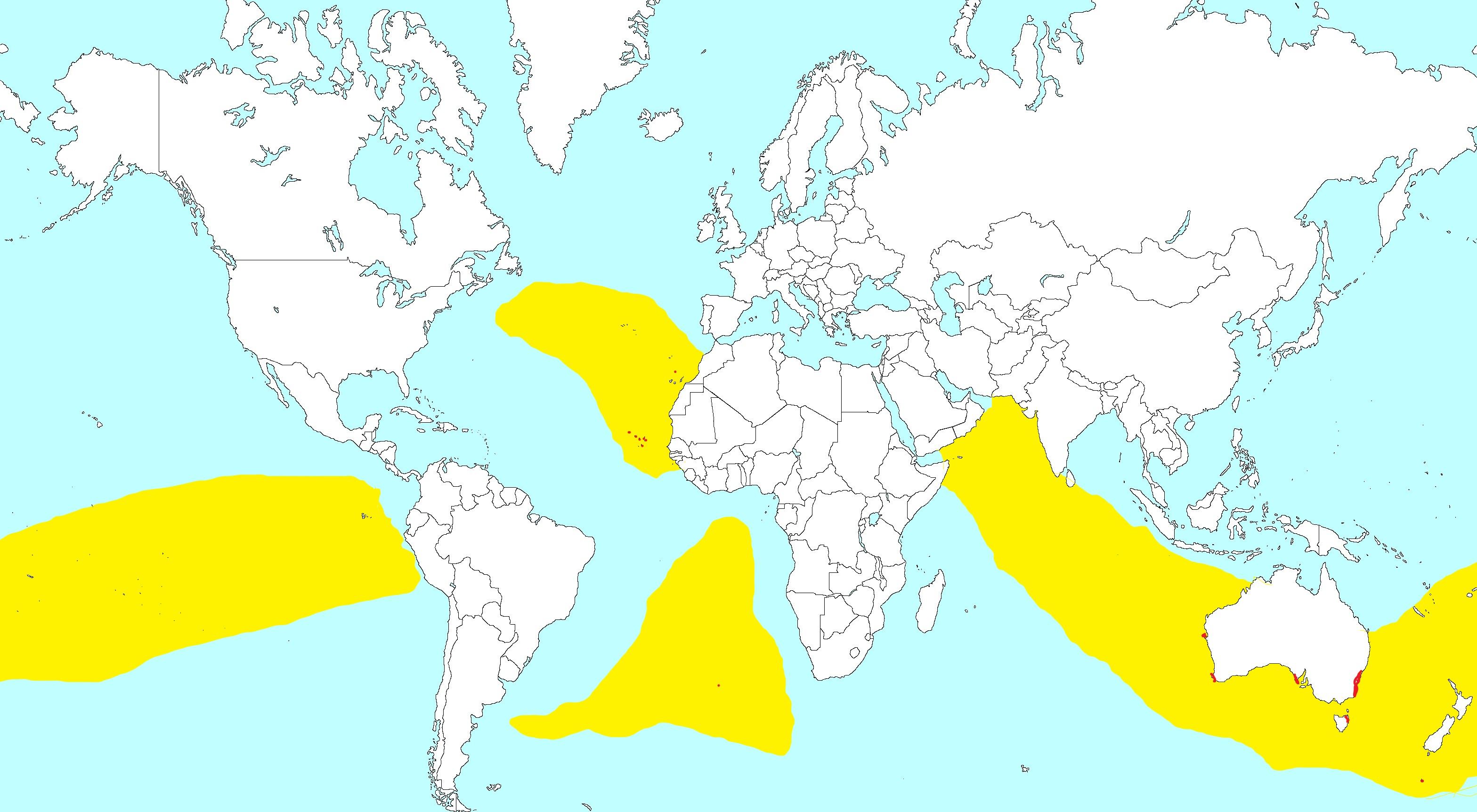
- Distribution map of the species

Synonyms
- Procellaria marina Latham, 1790

= White-faced storm petrel =

Species of bird

The white-faced storm petrel (Pelagodroma marina), (Māori: takahikare) also known as white-faced petrel or frigate petrel, is a small seabird of the austral storm petrel family Oceanitidae. It is the only member of the monotypic genus Pelagodroma. It is widely distributed across the northern and southern hemisphere, especially around the coastal and open ocean waters of southern Australia, New Zealand, Tristan da Cunha, Cabo Verde, the Canary islands and the Selvagens islands.

== Subspecies and their distributions ==
Here are six recognised subspecies, breeding in island colonies through subtropical to subantarctic regions of the Atlantic, Indian and south-western Pacific Oceans in both hemisphere:

- P. m. albiclunis Murphy & Irving, 1951 – Kermadec Islands
- P. m. dulciae Mathews, 1912 – islands off southern Australia, Houtman Abrolhos in Western Australia, east to the Broughton Islands in New South Wales and Tasmania.
- P. m. eadesi or eadoserum Bourne, 1953– Cape Verde Islands, within the North Atlantic.
- P. m. hypoleuca (Webb, Berthelot & Moquin-Tandon, 1842)– Savage Islands (Selvages Islands) in the North-east Atlantic being the host the majority of the world's population of this subspecies with only 50 pairs of breeding elsewhere. An estimate from 1996 suggested a total of 61,000 breeding pairs in the Selvagens Archipelago with 36,000 counted on Selvagem Grande alone. Other breeding spots which are Canary Islands such as Montaña Clara and Alegranza.
- P. m. maoriana Mathews, 1912 – islands around New Zealand, including the Chatham, Auckland Islands and Whero Island.
- P. m. marina (Latham, 1790) – Nightingale Islands, Tristan da Cunha, Inaccessible and Gough Island (Nominate subspecies).

== Description ==
Commonly, the white-faced storm petrel is 19 to 21 centimetres (7.5 to 8.3 in) in length with a 41 to 44 centimetres (16 to 17 in) wingspan and 40 to 70 grams body mass. The key characteristics of this species include dark bill, tarsi, toes and claws. It has a pale brown to grey back, rump and wings with black flight feathers. It is white below, unlike other north Atlantic petrels, and has a white face with a black eye mask like a phalarope. Its distinctive grey-brown dorsal side plumage makes it one of the easier petrels to identify at sea from a distance. Both sexes of this frigate petrel have similar plumage with no seasonal variation. However, they have slight differences with females are larger than males in tarsus, wing and tail lengths by around 1–3%. On the other hand, males have a larger bill depth than females by about 1.7%.

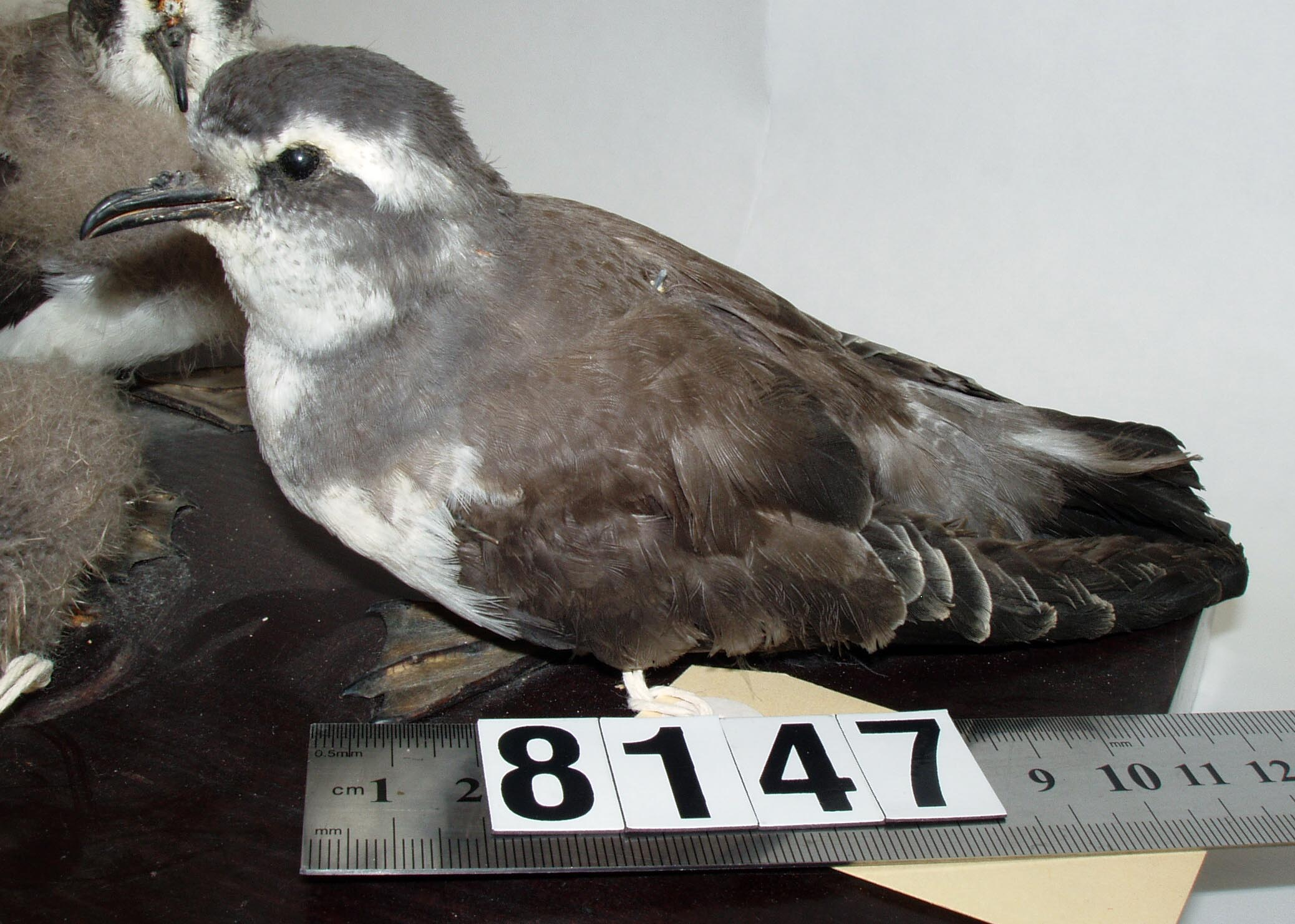
Size and look of the species from the side

While the juvenile and adult are similar, the juvenile's fresh plumage tends to have larger light fringes and tips to upperparts feathers, and depending on the moult, it may seem grey or brown. The juvenile's tail fork is also often shallower than the adult's, at least in the case of the subspecies in New Zealand, P. m. maoriana.

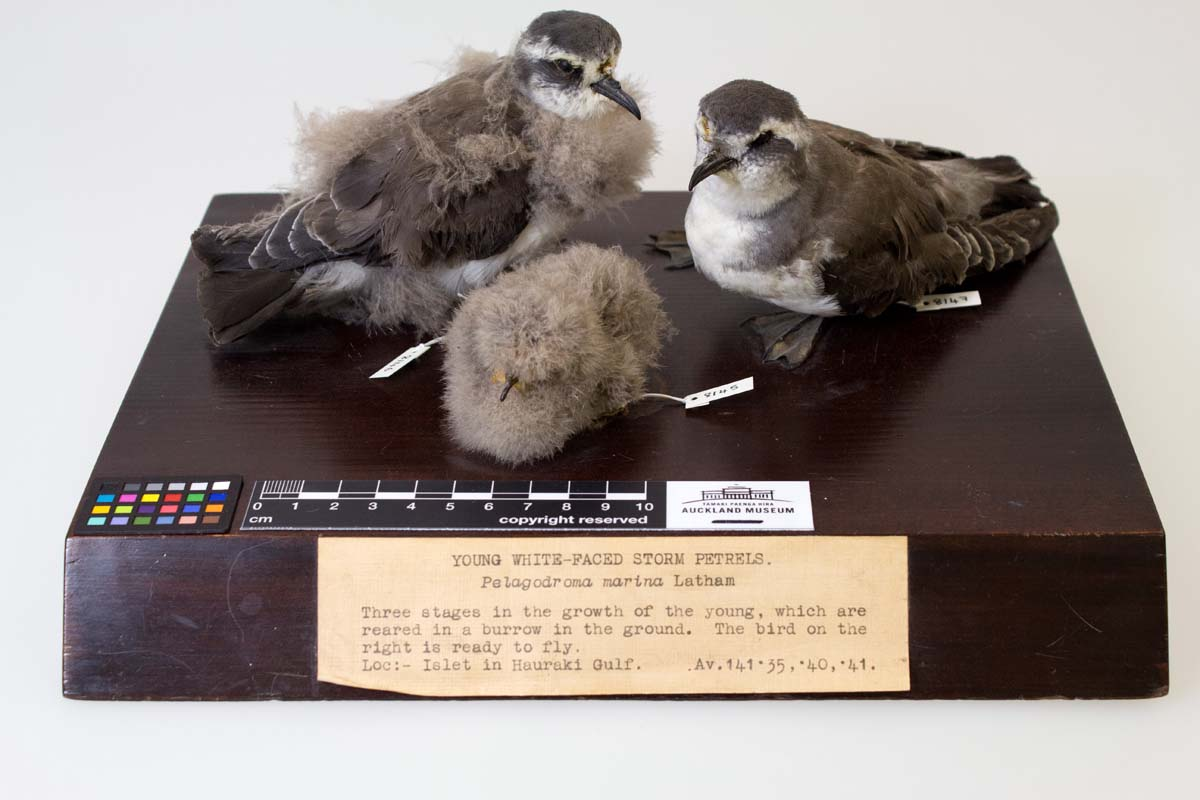
Young White-Faced Storm Petrel of three growth stages

Certain subspecies exhibit subtle differences such as a subspecies on the Kermedec Islands, P. m. albiclunis is similar to P. m. dulciae but notable for its white rump and shorter, square tail, setting it apart from P. m. dulciae and P. m. maoriana which have pale grey rumps. The P. m. albiclunis also has white upper tail coverts instead of the usual grey that make them highly distinct. Furthermore, P. m. albiclunis have a bit smaller dimensions compared to those of P. m. dulciae. However, both of them display square tails and whitier face and breast sides than P. m. maoriana. In contrast, the white-faced storm petrel from New Zealand, P. m. maoriana has forked tail, characterized by the dark patches on the sides of the breast. It also has shorter culmen, tarsus and middle toe lengths with claw than other North Atlantic counterparts like P. m. dulciae and P. m. albiclunis. They also have longer tail than the average of other subspecies.

For P. m. eadesi found in Cape Verde Islands, it has slightly paler colour of plumage than the P. m. hypoleuca, with a paler forehead and hindneck. It also has a longer beak (18–20.5 mm against 16–19 mm in P. m. hypoleuca) and whiter neck sides that create an incomplete collar.

== Behaviour ==
The white-faced storm petrel is strictly pelagic outside the breeding season, and this, together with its often-remote breeding sites, makes this petrel a difficult bird to see from land. Only in severe storms might this species be pushed into headlands. It is highly gregarious, but does not follow ships. This seabird burrows on both rocky slopes and flat sandy areas, favoring isolated islets for its nests. Like most petrels, its walking ability is limited to a short shuffle to the burrow.

=== Breeding ===
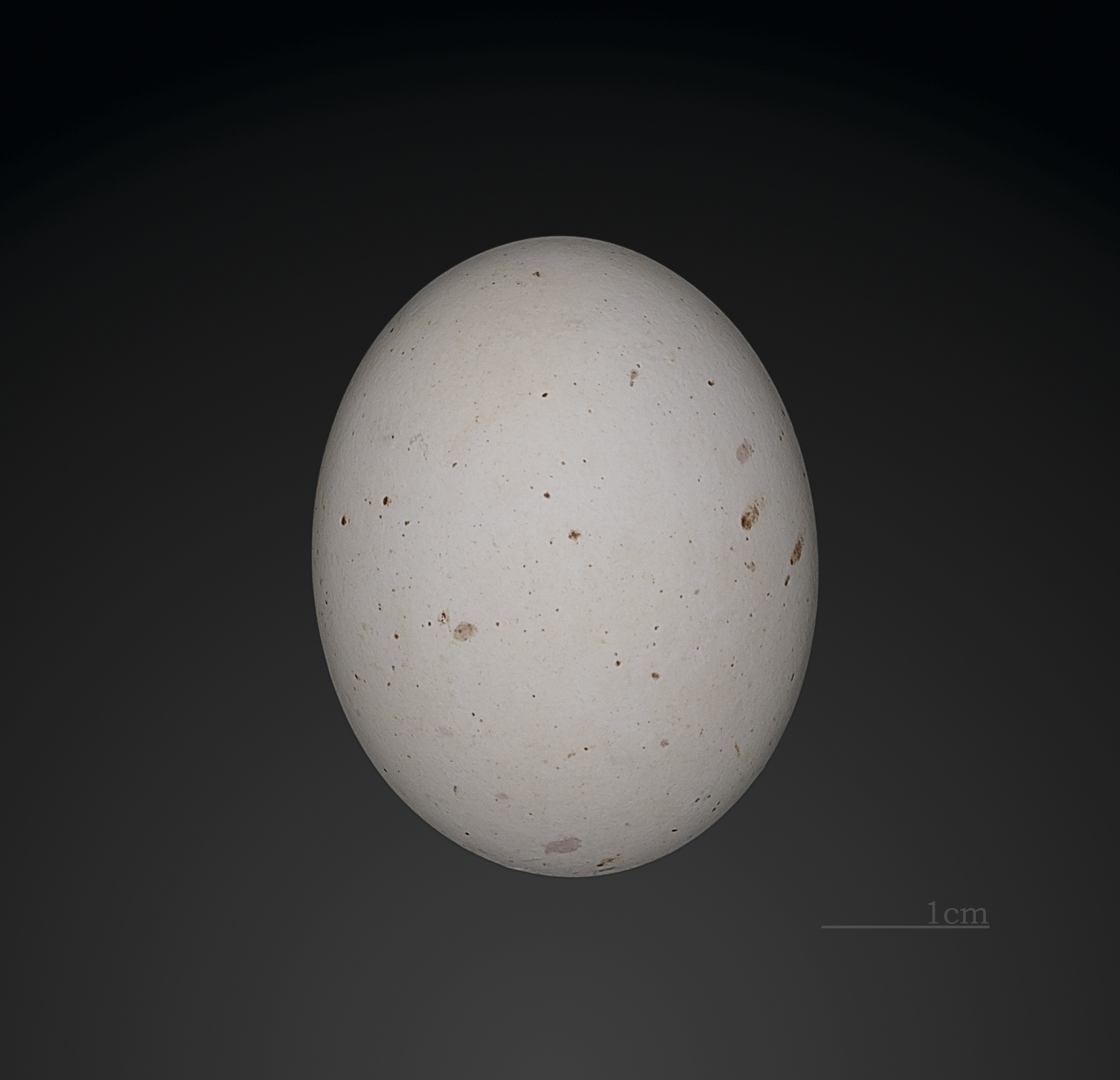
Egg - MHNT

The white-faced storm petrel breeds on remote islands in the south Atlantic, such as Tristan da Cunha and also Australia and New Zealand. There are also north Atlantic colonies on the Cape Verde Islands, Canary Islands and Savage Islands. It nests in dense colonies close to the sea in rock crevices and lays a single white egg. The burrows are very dense especially in forested areas where vegetation such as hollyhock and grasses help stabilize the soil, reducing the potential of burrows to collapse. It spends the rest of the year at sea and strictly nocturnal at the breeding sites to avoid predation by gulls and skuas, and will even avoid coming to land on clear moonlit nights. Other than that, to reduce the risk of predation, burrows near the edge of a colony may offer advantages as birds can land and enter their burrows faster.

The breeding period is long and varies slightly between regions. Most of the time, this seabird will return to their colonies in September or October when they clean out their burrows for Mud islands' subspecies. Then, lay the single egg in late October or November. During this period, both of the parents share incubation duties in shifts lasting 4 to 6 days with an incubation period averaging about 56 days in New Zealand colonies and about 52 days in Mud Islands. This collaborative care extends to feeding the young, which both parents do once per night. The chicks are usually abandoned shortly before fledging, occur about 52 to 67 days after hatching. Since the Mud Islands' population is a real trans-equatorial migrant, their longer travel distances to non-breeding habitats may contribute to enhanced breeding synchrony. Moreover, in these populations, breeding synchronization is frequently seen in order to capitalize on favorable climate conditions and greater food supply, which may be scarce.

High site fidelity observed in this species where many partners will stick together and use the same burrow year after year. However, this tenacity may be lower at newly established colonies like in Bass Strait. In terms of breeding cycles that highlight the asynchrony, at Mud Islands, the young typically fledged between late January and late February which is earlier than the fledging dates at Whero Island, New Zealand, about mid-February to early April. This is because Procellariform species have been shown to exhibit asynchrony, especially when they inhabit geographically separated breeding colonies. It can also be influenced by local factors like predation, habitat features or from population factors such as the quality of the bird or age structure. Overall, this species exhibits extended incubation and chick-rearing periods like other Procellariformes which further emphasizes the complexities of their breeding biology.

In some regions, white-faced storm petrels face competition for nesting sites with other seabirds. In Tasmania, studies have documented displacement by short-tailed shearwaters (Puffinus tenuirostris) from favored burrowing areas. There were also same competition have been observed on Whero Island, where the storm petrels suffered not so much from hostility by the prions, but from the fact that their nests simply happened to be in the prions' way. These interactions explain the challenges faced by these species in securing suitable nesting grounds especially when sharing habitats with larger or more dominant species.

Below is the table of different breeding cycles from different subspecies from this species:

Breeding cycle of different subspecies of White-faced storm petrel
Subspecies	Colony area	Return to colony	Egg laying Period	Hatching period	Incubation Period	Fledging Period	Fledging Duration	Total breeding period	Notable observations
P. m. albiclunis	Kermadec Islands	August	Mid-August to mid-late-September in southern hemisphere (in between the two North Atlantic population, P. m. hypoleuca and P. m. eadesi)	Late September to early November	Early November and ended in October (55 days)	Fledglings may depart late November to early January	Unknown	Late May to December	Kermadec Islands located in a warm ocean current account for earlier breeding based on latitude; Breeding spot cleared by this population from January to May other than stragglers
P. m. dulciae	Mud Islands, Port Philip Bay, Victoria	Early September	End-October to mid-December (mean = 11 November)	Mid-December to end-December (mean = 24 December)	(51.7 days)	Early to end-February (last chick to departure = 11 March)	over 31 days (no exact period)	September to mid-March (6 and a half months)	54% eggs success hatched; 14% lost - 32% were abandoned or possibly infertile - 77.8% fledged successfully - This breeding period in Australia appeared to be more coordinated than other regions
P. m. eadesi	Laje Branca, Cape Verde Islands	November	Late January to March	Mid-March to mid-April	(~47 days)	Early May to mid-June	Unknown	Mid-November to mid-June	1 month earlier compared to subspecies in Selvagen Grande Island, P. m. hypoleuca.; The colonies in this population sits on the cool Canaries current account for later breeding
P. m. hypoleuca	Savage Islands or Salvagens Islands	Mid December	March to April (mean = 17 March)	Mid-May to mid-June	(53.7 days)	Mid-July to mid-August (last chick to departure = mid August)	60.3 days	Mid-December to mid-August (9 months)	Some pairs took 30% longer incubation period causes from neglected egg- The colonies in this population sits on the cool Canaries current account for later breeding and longer incubation periods
P. m. maoriana	Whero Island, New Zealand	Mid-September	(Late October to late December) mean = 16 November	Late-December to early February (mean = January)	(~50 days)	Mid-February to early-April	54 days	Mid-September to mid- April	
P. m. marina	Tristan da Cunha	Unknown	August to September	Unknown	Unknown	Late December to January	Unknown	August to May	

=== Migratory ===
==== P. m. dulciae ====
Those that breed on islands from Western Australia to New South Wales mostly migrate north-west to the Arabian Sea and Indian Ocean (May to July) but rarely entering Indian waters (May to September), while the migration routes of eastern colonies remain unclear. One individual breeding on Mud Islands (Victoria) was recovered 3070 km to west, and documented from east to Riau Archipelago, off northern Sumatra on October

==== P. m. eadesi ====
This subspecies of white-faced storm petrels that breed in Cape Verde shows distinct migratory pattern from previous studies. After the breeding season, they were travelling clockwise in May and June to the northwest Atlantic and then returning to Cabo Verde or Cape Verde in October and November through the northeast. Then, the birds spent the non breeding season in regions connected to seamounts along the mid-Atlantic Ridge and south of the Azores.

During the non-breeding season, the species is most active at night, indicating that it benefits from the diel-vertical migration of seamount-associated nekton and zooplankton. Additionally, because of the decreased capacity to fly during the moulting season, the amount of time spent on the water before returning to the colony increased.

==== P. m. marina ====
It migrates east to Africa, reaching southern waters around South Africa, then west to South America, with data indicating that this subspecies has reached Tierra del Fuego (55°S).

=== Foraging and flight ===
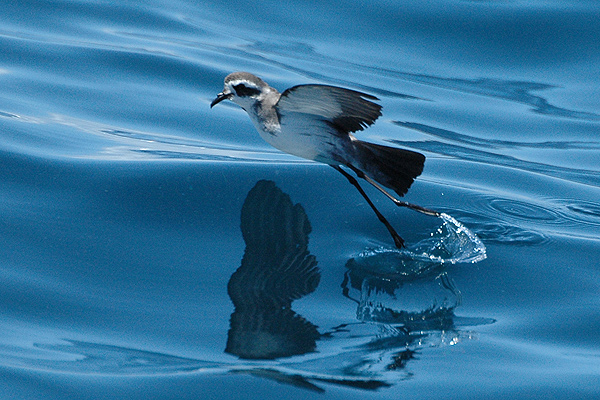
The distinctive "pattering" behaviour of white-faced storm petrel on the water surface

White-faced storm petrels described as surface foragers because they often seen pattering on the water by stretching out their wings and using their long legs to lightly touch the water surface while maintaining flight. The use of pattering is significant in this Oceanitidae family but this species pattering almost all the time than other petrels. However, during strong wind, they move like pendulum by swinging side-to-side using their feet to push off the water, facing the wind and they will glide quickly across the water with stiff extended wings and one leg lowered when moving between feeding spots. This behaviour is influenced by their low wing loading, low foot loading and a long tarsus that contribute to the unique frequent pattering style differentiating them in flight performance. Interestingly, this species does not make extensive use of dynamic soaring to fly over the ocean surface which typically used by most other storm petrel, especially the northern storm petrels. This frequent contact with the water, combined with their foraging method, hovering with the feet briefly touching down before bounding forward, may contribute to the accumulation of gelatinous anklets on their tarsi, as observed in individuals that breed in Chatham Islands. These anklets that are composed of trematode filaments could cause them entangled in vegetation. Additionally, the formation of anklets and ligaments is more frequent due to the species' foraging strategy of hovering close to the surface with their tarsi positioned closely together. Thus, it highlights the close interaction with the surface layer of the ocean while feeding, particularly in shallow waters.

They mainly travel for significant distances to forage, covering up to 400 km from their breeding colony. Observations recorded from ships indicate that they generally forage over continental shelves while sometimes venturing near the African coast and Canary Islands, particularly during chick rearing due to high productivity. During incubation, the foraging trips average around 5.1 days with more than 700 km total distance covered by this species. Meanwhile, during chick rearing, trips shorten to 3 days covering approximately 578 km to ensure consistent feeding for their chicks. For species in north-east Atlantic, they seem to travel without strong directional preferences for any well-defined foraging hotspot during incubation explaining that they are widely distributed when finding preys. Additionally, this white-faced storm petrels tend to exhibit higher travel speed at night during incubation period which suggests that they may patter less frequent and feed less time during nighttime compared to the chick-rearing period. This is because the chick rearing period is more energetically demanding and thus, resulting the birds to more likely forage at both day and night time. Therefore, it leads to similar travel speeds during both periods as they increase their efforts to provide consistent feeding for their chicks.

=== Diet ===
These white-faced petrels are opportunistic feeders in which they could consume a diverse array of prey based on availability. They will take fish offal that has been thrown overboard. They might also primarily feed at night. Studies at the Chatham Islands found the white-face storm petrels feed on a wide range of krill, amphipods, planktonic crustaceans, and small fish. Mesopelagic fish is one of their diet preferences to consume especially from Myctophidae family (FO = 71%) in the Pacific and North-east Atlantic. Meanwhile, the second biggest group diet are cephalopods (FO = 24%), most of which come from Mastigoteuthis magna species. Crustaceans like Hyperiidea and crab megalops also make up part of their diet. For the petrel subspecies that breed on Chalky Island and forage in the Bass Strait, they are also known as generalist diet with a majority of individuals are feeding on coastal krill and post-larval fish. The majority of prey are from the surface while flying or pattering, but occasionally while resting on the surface.

Interestingly, because of sexual dimorphism in which females are larger than males, they may feed their offspring larger portions. However, this may come at a higher energy cost, which could then influence the offspring's ability to reproduce and general health. During chick rearing, since white-faced storm petrels adjust their foraging patterns to meet higher energy demands by feeding their chicks at day and night, they have been observed consuming both mesopelagic and epipelagic prey which is consistent with their dispersal throughout ocean, as mesopelagic fish are hard to access in the shallower areas. It is also indicated that the species in North Atlantic may raise their chicks primarily with mesopelagic prey because they can accumulate higher mercury concentrations than nearshore species. This diet can be proved by the mercury measurements in their feathers that showed the reliance on deeper water prey during this crucial point in life stage.

== Diseases ==
White-faced storm petrels are affected by a trematode Syncoelium filiferum, which uses the krill species Nematoscelis megalops as an intermediate host. The petrels appear to be an accidental or dead-end host for the larvae of the trematode, which need to attach themselves to the gill filaments of near-surface fish to continue their life cycle. Metacercariae of S. filiferum attach using sticky filaments reaching 60 millimetres (2.4 in) long, which adhere to the legs of the petrel and subsequently dry out as the petrels leave the water, resulting in trematode death. The petrels can become caught in vegetation and die. This phenomenon has been described among white-faced storm petrel populations in the Chatham Islands, where it reportedly causes mortality epidemics. The trematode larvae also attach to the legs of fairy prions but do not often cause bridging leg connections in that species.

== Status and conservation ==
Widespread throughout its large range, the white-faced storm petrel is evaluated as Least Concern on the IUCN Red List of Threatened Species. However, certain regional populations have experienced significant declines due to habitat changes and other environmental pressures.

=== Threats ===
==== Mud Islands (P. m. dulciae) ====
The colony of white-faced storm petrels at Mud Islands located off the coast of Victoria, Australia has been a significant population decline over the last century. Changes in habitat, vegetation, increased pressures from other species to conquer breeding areas, and human activity have all contributed to this decline. Below is the chronology happened to the decrease of Australian white faced storm petrel;

- Early 1900s: The vegetation of the white-faced storm petrel was characterised as having a succulent herb land with bower spinach (Tetragonia implexicoma) as the dominant plant. During this time, the vegetation began to undergo significant changes.
- 1928: The first population estimate recorded around 22,000 pairs of this subspecies on Mud Islands.
- 1940s: By this period, bower spinach was no longer recorded on the islands, likely due to intense grazing pressure from European rabbits (Oryctolagus cunciculus) which eliminated the species and resulted in low-lying vegetation and increased erosion.
- 1958: The population dropped significantly to 10,000 pairs.
- 1978: The estimates of white-face storm petrel recorded was only 5,600 pairs indicating a continued decline.
- Mid-1980s: European rabbits were removed from the islands but significant habitat changes had already occurred.
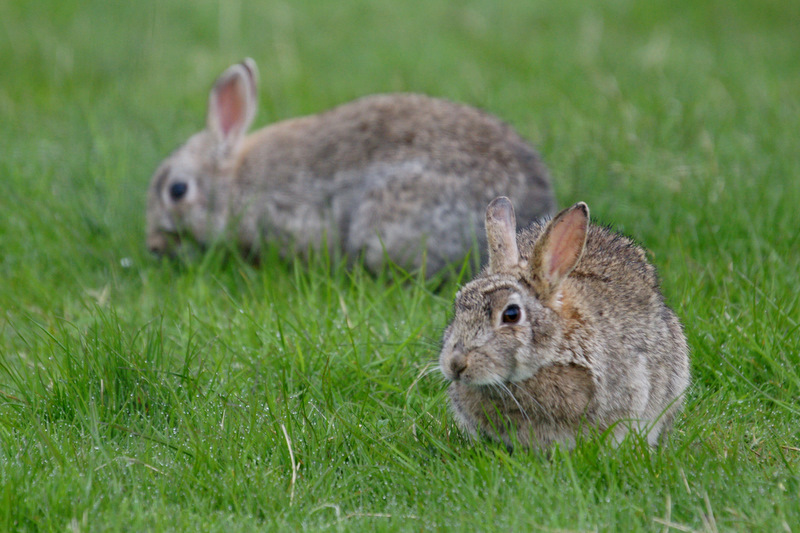
  European rabbits
- 1990s: An increase in the number of other breeding bird species especially silver gulls (Larus novaehollandiae) and both Australian white ibis (Threskiornis molucca) and straw-necked ibis (T. spinicollis) resulted in further changes to the vegetation composition of Mud Islands. This also led to increased phosphorus and nitrogen levels in the soil. Moreover, there were other two species, coast salt bush (Atriplex cinerea) and Australian hollyhock (Lavetera arborea) showed very high in distribution and became dominant within the colony of white-faced storm petrel.
- 2007: There were less than 2,500 pairs of this subspecies in the Islands.
- Recent observations: Given Mud Islands' proximity to Melbourne city in Australia, white-faced storm petrel from this colony may be exposed to higher levels of plastic pollution compared to colonies in more remote locations such as Chalky Island with lower number of human population in Bass Strait. The increased human activity in the nearby city likely contributes to the elevated plastic contamination observed in these birds which could further impact their health and population numbers.

===== South Channel Fort (P. m. dulciae) =====
- 1920s: White-faced storm petrels first recorded breeding in this artificial island.
- 1978: The estimated population was more than 6000 pairs.
- Present: Population significantly smaller.

Potential Threats

- The invasive African boxthorn (Lycium ferocissimum) spread across the island, resulting in some petrels and silver gulls getting stuck on the thorns.
- Few of this subspecies have been discovered drowning in gun emplacements or stuck in the tunnel system
- Human visitors trampling burrows, causing disturbance.

==== Tullaberga Island (P. m. dulciae) ====
- 1978: Estimated population was over 21,000 pairs, being the biggest colony of this species in Victoria
- Present: The population has probably decreased, and the status was unclear.

Potential Threats

- Increased population of short-tailed shearwaters (Puffinus tenuirostris) potentially competing with white-faced storm petrels for nesting areas.

Conservations

- No visitor could access to the island to protect the seabird populations there.

==== Savage Islands (P. m. hypoleuca) ====
For this subspecies, due to its restricted breeding range which primarily nests in the Salvages Archipelago in the north-east Atlantic, they are considered vulnerable and has been designated as "Species of European Conservation Concern".

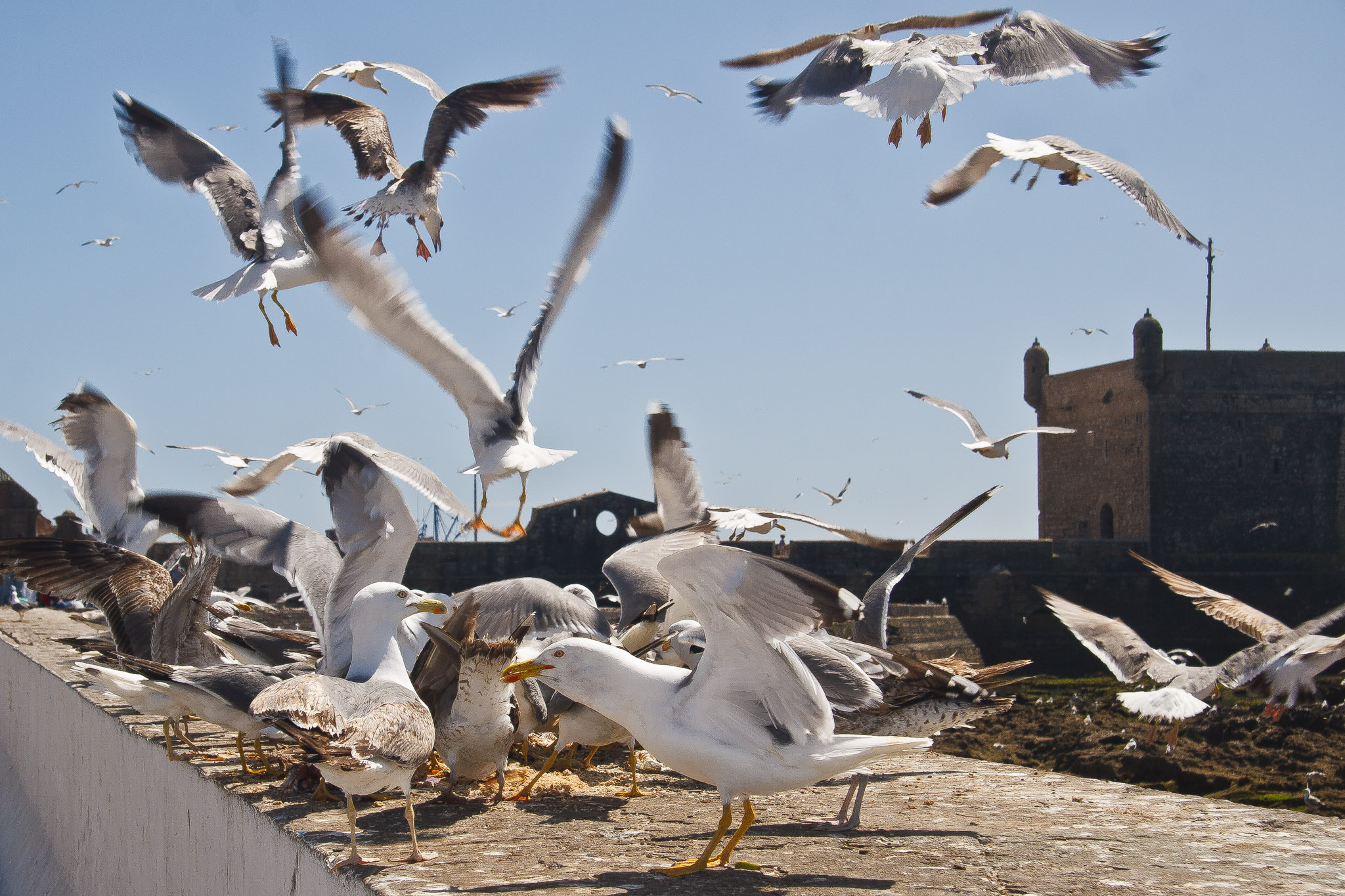
Atlantic yellow-legged gulls

Potential Threats and Population Estimates

- Late 15th century: Same potential threats as previous subspecies, rabbits (Oryctolagus cunciculus) were introduced intentionally to the Salvages Archipelago when the islands were first discovered.
- Unknown date: House mice (Mus musculus) have been presented on the islands for centuries was likely brought over unintentionally, posed a significant threat to the breeding colonies. Another concerning potential threats were the petrel predators that can prey on the storm petrel called yellow-legged gulls, expanding in the population few years ago.
- 2010s: Yellow-legged gulls consumed thousands of this petrel species almost every year. At the same time, these gulls have become a major factor in the decline of the petrel population.

Furthermore, the white-faced storm petrels that live in the pelagic ecosystems of the subtropical northeast Atlantic like this subspecies are increasingly affected by plastic contamination. These birds had plastic particles in their stomachs in at least 79% of them. Research conducted through analyzing the regurgitated pellets of yellow legged gulls showed the growing impact of pollution in their environment.
