= Roque del Oeste =

Uninhabited Spanish Island in the Atlantic

Coordinates: 29.311°N 13.527°W

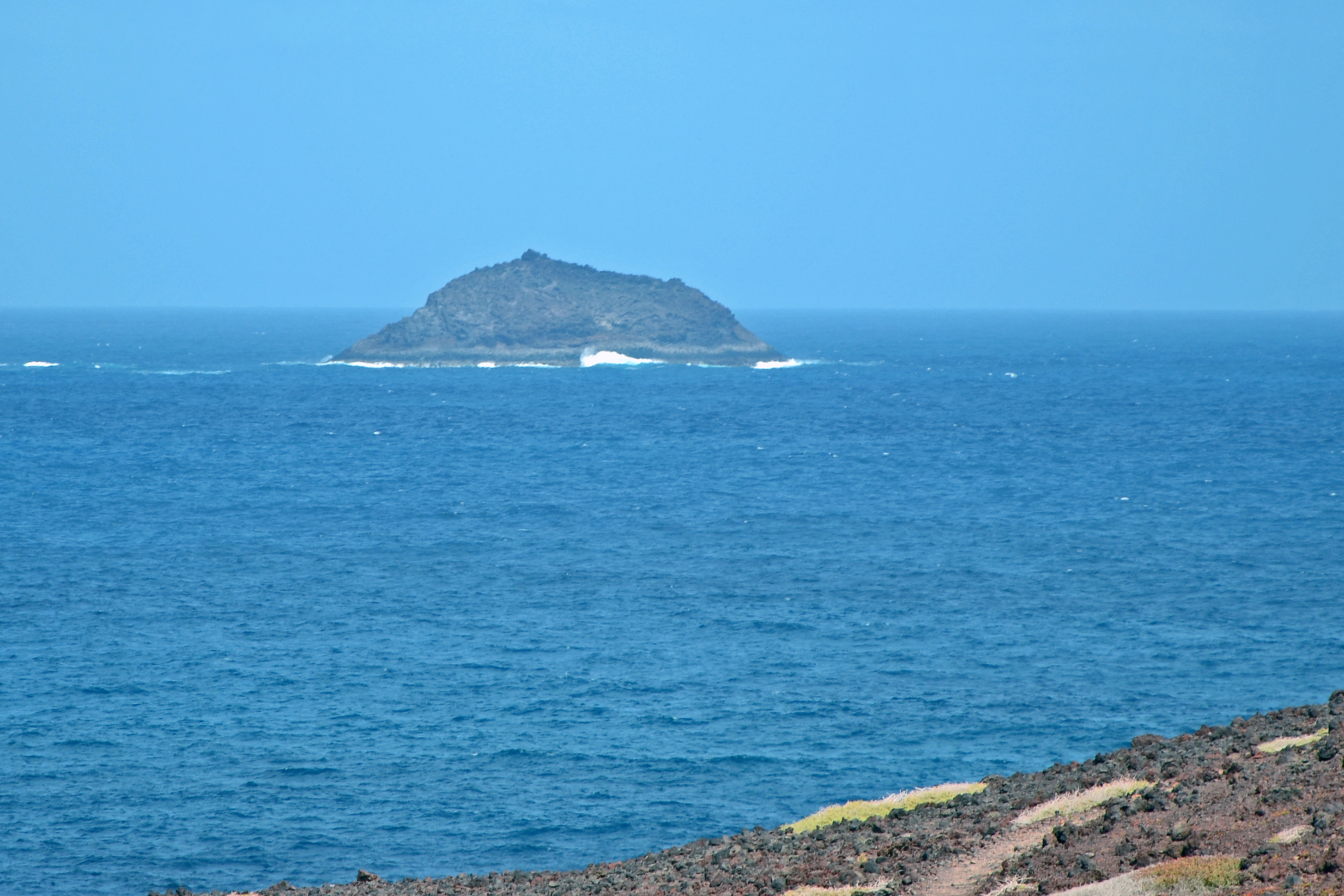
- Roque del Oeste

Geography
- Archipelago: Chinijo Archipelago
- Area: 0.02 km^{2} (0.0077 sq mi)
- Highest elevation: 41 m (135 ft)

Administration
- Spain
- Autonomous Community: Canary Islands
- Province: Las Palmas
- Municipality: Teguise

Demographics
- Population: 0 (2013)

Roque del Oeste (pronounced [ˈroke ðel oˈeste]; Spanish for "rock of the west"), also referred to as Roque del Infierno (Spanish for "rock of the hell"), is an uninhabited islet located 0.6 km northeast of the island of Montaña Clara, in the northeasternmost part of the Canary Islands, the Chinijo Archipelago. The highest point of the island is 41 m above sea level. The island is part of the nature reserve Los Islotes, which is part of the natural park Chinijo Archipelago.

== See also ==
- Geology of the Canary Islands
- List of islands of Spain
