= Bay of Ceuta =

Coordinates: 35.916667°N 5.316667°W

The Bay of Ceuta is a bay on the African coast of the Straits of Gibraltar. It accounts for the majority of the north coast of the Spanish city of Ceuta. It stretches from Punta Blanca in the west to Isla de Santa Catalina, off the coast of the Península de Almina in the east, a distance of eight kilometres (five miles). Ceuta's harbour lies on the bay.
