= Chinijo Archipelago =

Archipelago in the Canary Islands

Native name: Archipiélago Chinijo
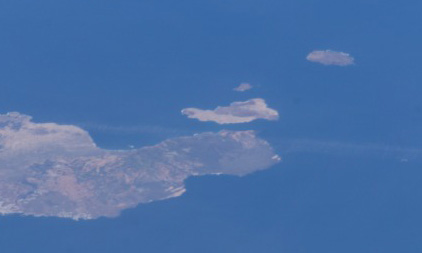
- Lanzarote, La Graciosa, Montaña Clara and Alegranza from above

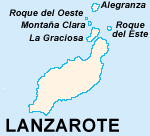
- Map of Chinijo Archipelago
- Etymology: Small archipelago

Geography
- Location: Atlantic Ocean
- Total islands: 5
- Area: 40.9 km^{2} (15.8 sq mi)
- Coastline: 54.435 km (33.8243 mi)

Administration
- Spain
- Autonomous Community: Canary Islands
- Province: Las Palmas
- Island: Lanzarote
- Municipality: Teguise
- Largest settlement: Caleta de Sebo (pop. 730)

Demographics
- Population: 734 (2018)
- Languages: Spanish, specifically Canarian Spanish

Additional information
- Time zone: WET (UTC±00:00)
  - Summer (DST): WEST (UTC+01:00)

The Chinijo Archipelago (pronounced [tʃiˈnixo]) is a small group of islands located in the northeastern part of the Canary Islands. The archipelago includes the islets of Montaña Clara, Alegranza, La Graciosa, Roque del Este and Roque del Oeste, of which La Graciosa is the largest and only inhabited island. The term "Chinijo" is a local colloquial adjective meaning "small" reflecting the archipelago's reduced dimensions. The Chinijo Archipelago forms part of the national park Parque natural del Archipiélago established in 1986, and is part of a large marine reserve.

== History ==
The Chinijo Archipelago is primarily of volcanic origin, with its islets formed approximately 10 million years ago by the activity of a corona volcano in northern Lanzarote. French explorer Jean de Béthencourt, who explored Lanzarote in the early 1400s, traversed the waters leading to La Graciosa in the Chinijo Archipelago. The archipelago was declared as part of Chinijo Archipelago Natural Park in 1986, and forms part of one of the largest marine reserves in Europe. The term "Chinijo" is a local colloquial adjective meaning "small" reflecting the archipelago's smaller dimensions.

== Geography ==
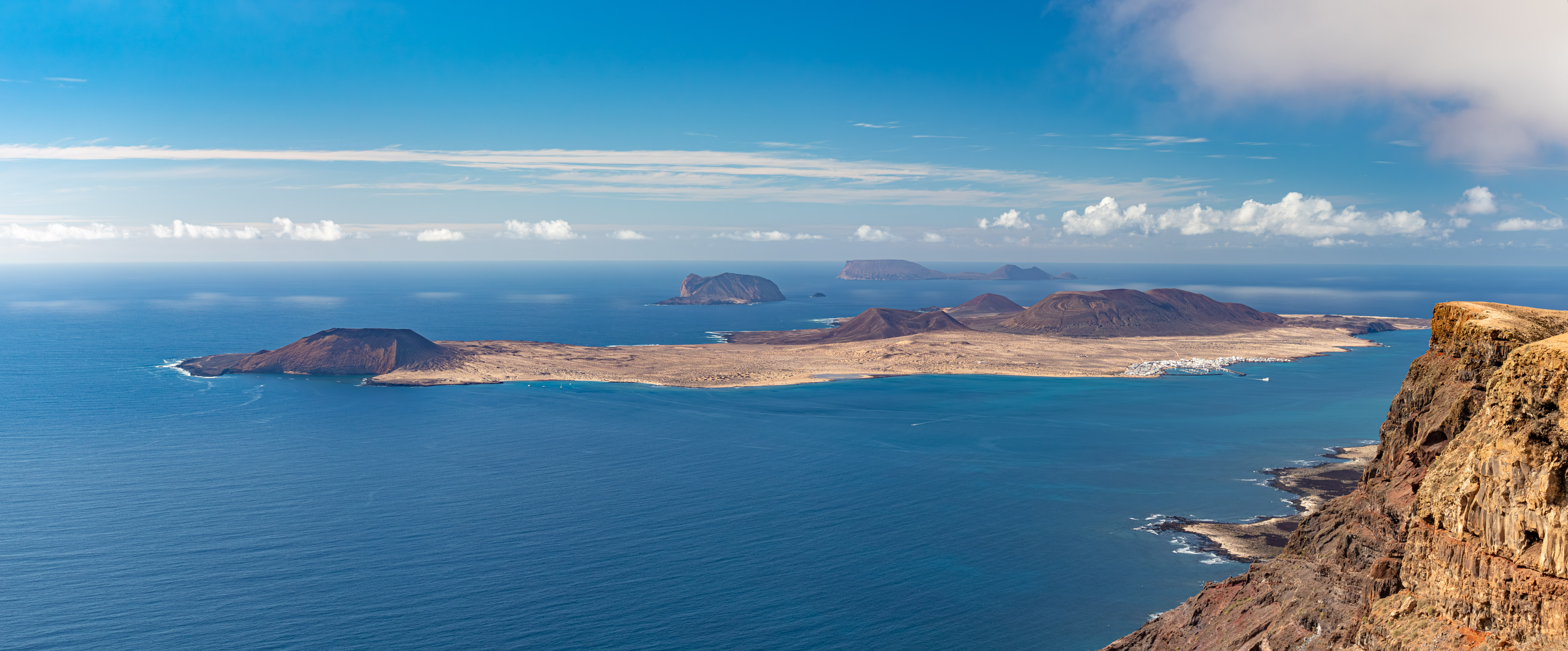
La Graciosa and other islands of Chinijo Archipelago seen from Lanzarote

Chinijo is a small group of islands located in the northeastern part of the Canary Islands. The archipelago includes the islets of Montaña Clara, Alegranza, La Graciosa, Roque del Este and Roque del Oeste, of which La Graciosa is the largest and only inhabited island. The Chinijo Archipelago Natural Park covers a total area 91.12 km^{2} (35.2 sq mi), and includes parts north of the island of Lanzarote. The area of the natural park overlaps with that of a designated marine reserve. Regular ferries operated to La Graciosa, while other islands can only be accessed by small fishing boats, and is prohibited to land in these islands.

== Topography ==
The Chinijo Archipelago consists of predominantly volcanic highlands characterized by numerous volcanic cones and craters. Montaña Clara in the islands the largest volcanic crater in the archipelago. The topography consists of sandy beaches interspersed with volcanic rocks with scattered vegetation consisting of shrubs and succulent plants.

Volcanoes
Volcano	Commune / Locality	Description	Altitude	Photograph
Montaña Amarilla,	La Graciosa; 29°13′0″N 13°32′0″W	Volcanic cone	172 m	
Montaña Bermeja	La Graciosa	Volcanic cone	157 m	
Montaña Lobos	Close to coast of Alegranza 29°23′0″N 13°30′0″W	Volcanic cone	221 m	
Montaña del Mojon	Coast of La Graciosa 29°14′0″N 13°30′0″W	Volcanic cone	188 m	
Montaña de Pedre Barba	La Graciosa; 29°15′0″N 13°30′0″W	Volcanic cone	266 m	
Montaña Clara	Montaña Clara 29°17′0″N 13°32′0″W	Volcanic cone	256 m	
Roque del Oeste	Teguise, Chinijo 29°19′0″N 13°31′0″W	Volcanic cone	41 m	
Roque del Este	Teguise, Chinijo 29°16′35″N 13°20′15″W	Volcanic cone	84 m	

== See also ==
- Geology of the Canary Islands
