= Roque del Este =

Uninhabited Spanish Island in the Atlantic

Coordinates: 29°16′37″N 13°20′13″W

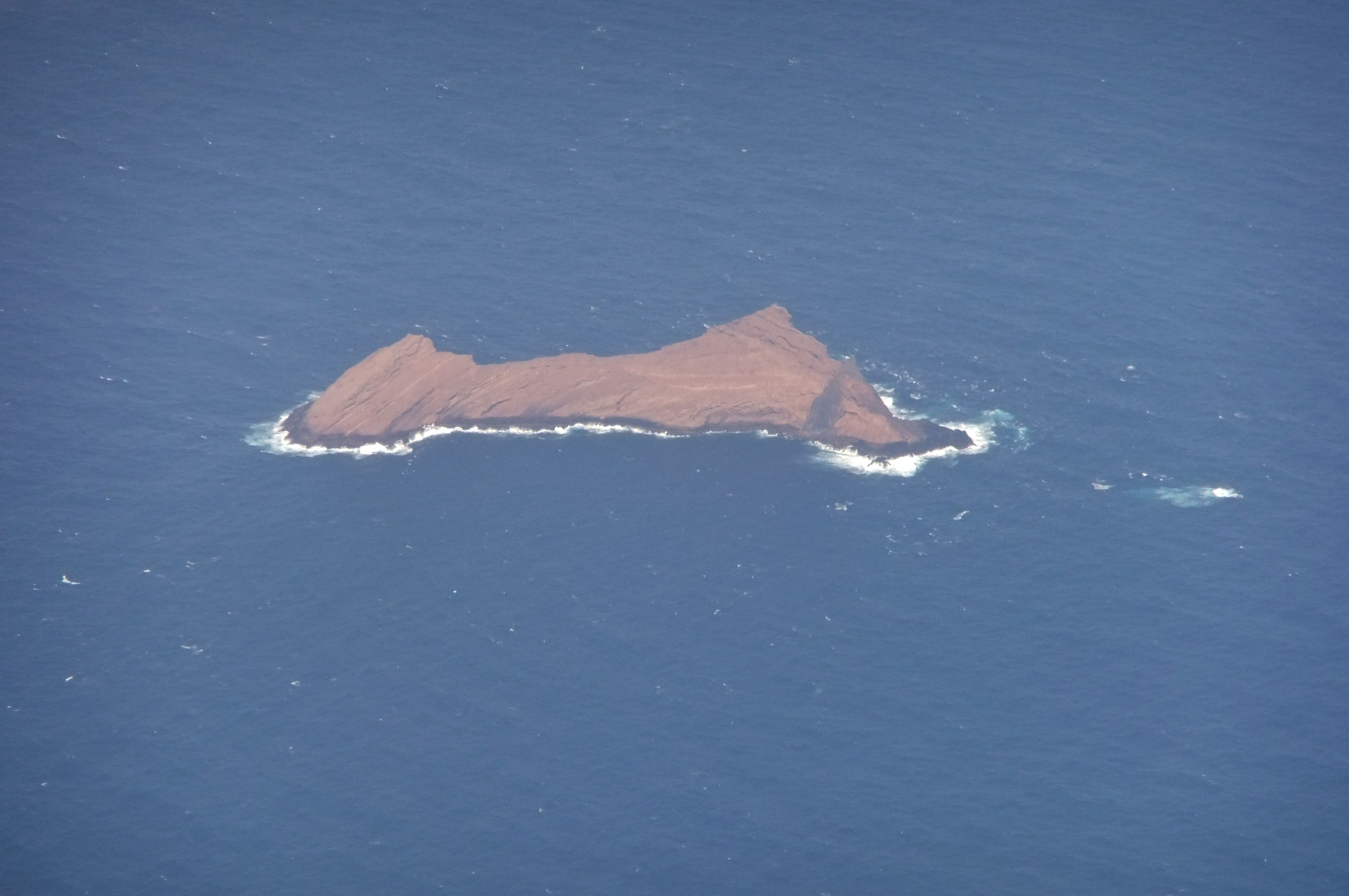
- Roque Del Este seen from the east

Geography
- Archipelago: Chinijo Archipelago
- Area: 0.06 km^{2} (0.023 sq mi)
- Highest elevation: 84 m (276 ft)

Administration
- Spain
- Autonomous Community: Canary Islands
- Province: Las Palmas
- Municipality: Teguise

Demographics
- Population: 0 (2013)

Roque del Este (Spanish for "rock of the east") is a small uninhabited islet in the Canary Islands, located 11 kilometres (7 miles) northeast of the island of Lanzarote. The islet is part of the Chinijo Archipelago, which is administratively part of the municipality of Teguise.

Roque del Este is the easternmost islet of the Chinijo archipelago, and it is the second smallest. Like the rest of the Canary Islands, it is of volcanic origin. Its highest point is 84 m. The islet is part of the integral nature reserve Los Islotes, which is part of the natural park Chinijo Archipelago.

== See also ==
- Geology of the Canary Islands
