= A Toxa Island =

Island in Galicia, Spain

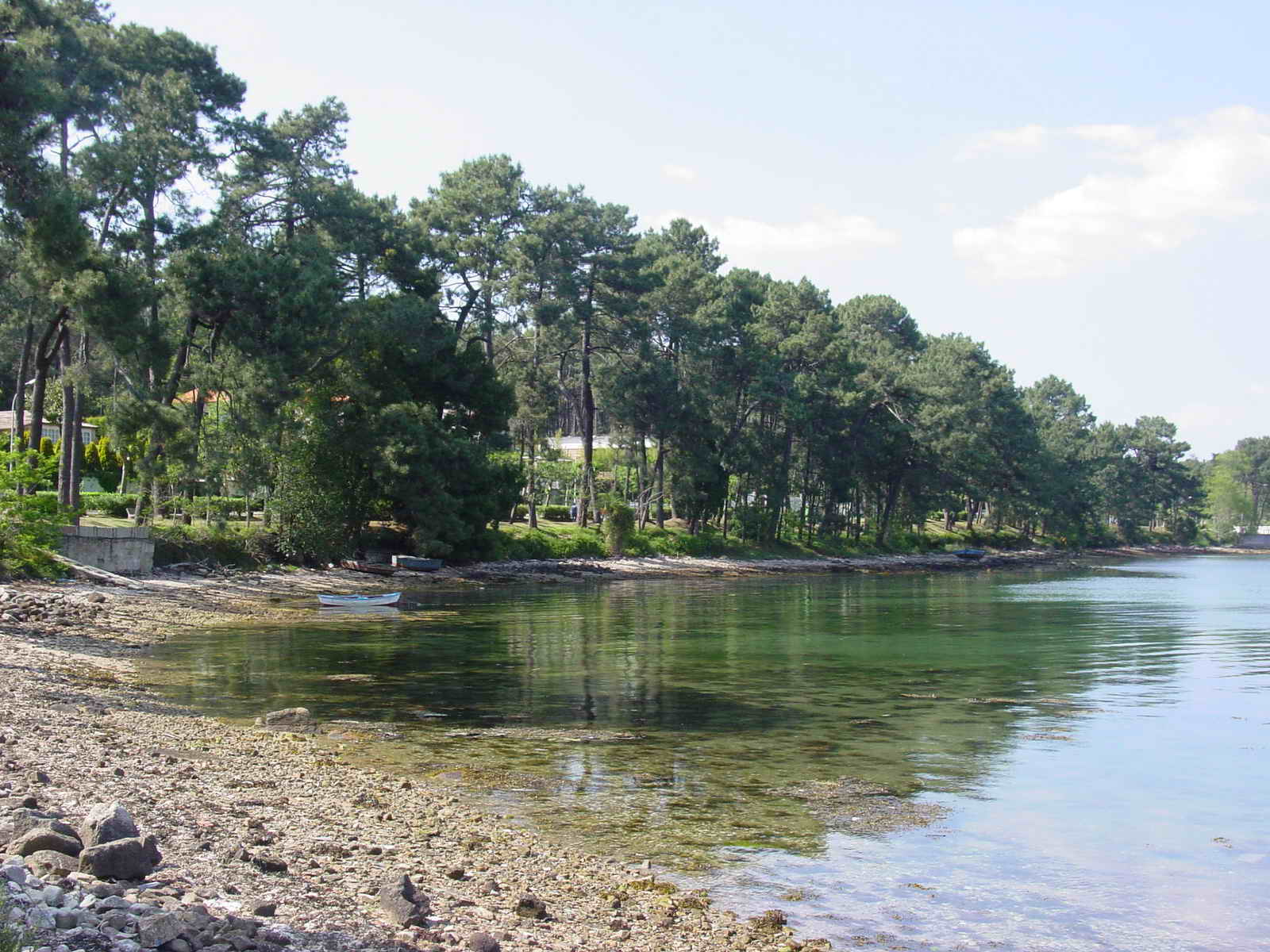
- View of the island.

- Location in Spain

Geography
- Coordinates: 42°29′22.0″N 8°50′55.0″W
- Area: 1.1 km^{2} (0.42 sq mi)
- Length: 2.17 km (1.348 mi)
- Width: 0.81 km (0.503 mi)
- Highest elevation: 42 m (138 ft)

Administration
- Spain
- Autonomous community: Galicia
- Province: Pontevedra
- Municipality: O Grove

Demographics
- Population: 47

A Toxa (also known as Illa da Toxa, Isla de la Toja, A Toxa Grande, La Toja grande, Island of Loujo or Island of the Baths of Loujo), in spanish La Toja is an island part of the municipality of O Grove, Galicia, Spain. Located east of the town, it's connected to the mainland by an 18th-century bridge. It has a small urban centre called Illa da Toxa, belonging to the civil parish of San Martín, which had 42 inhabitants in 2018. It has an area of 110 hectares and is located about 30 km from Pontevedra.

== Name ==
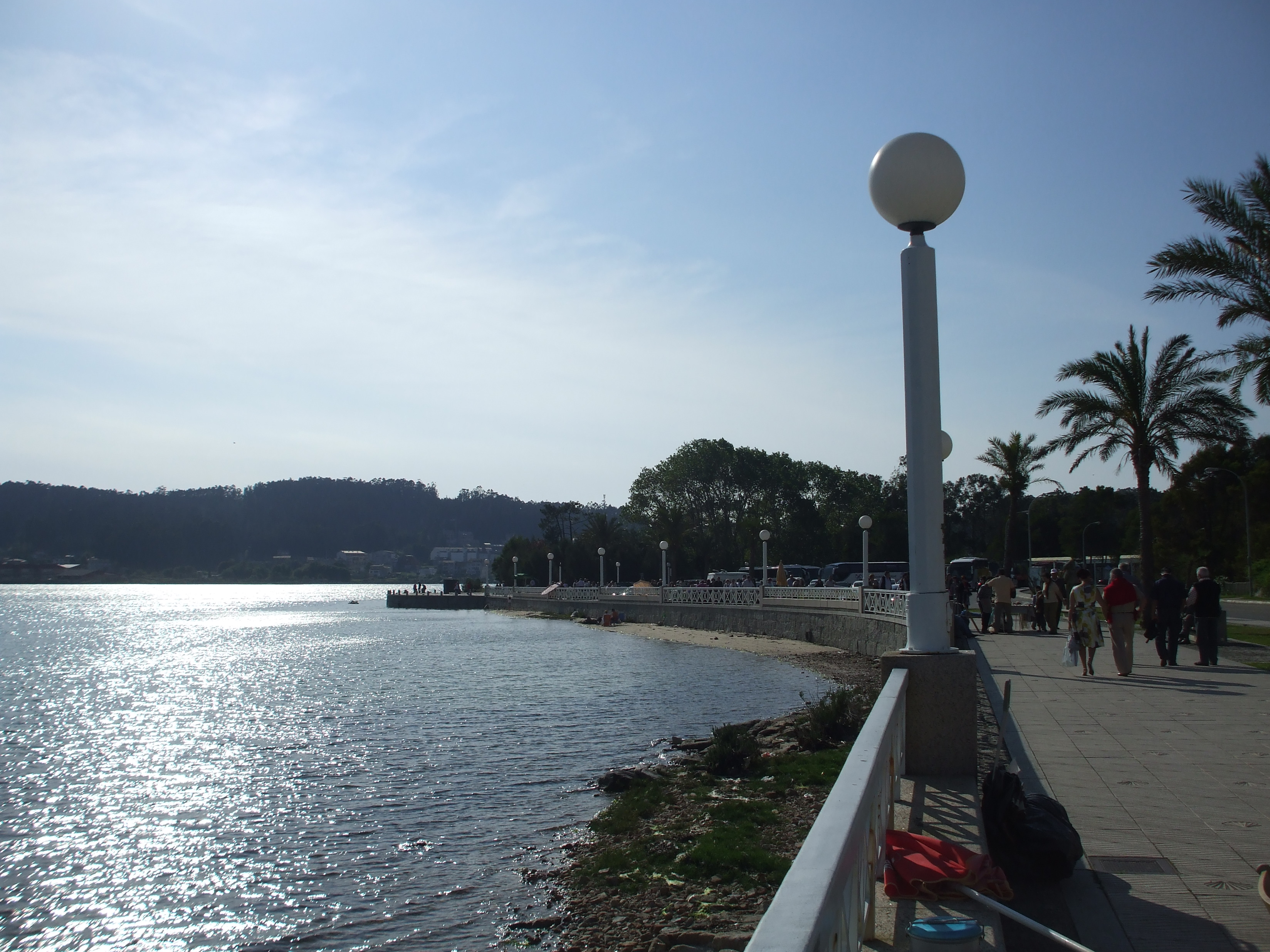
A Toxa Island

The island is traditionally given the original Galician names, illa de Louxo or illa da Toxa Grande; the latter name was devised to differentiate the name of this island from that of the island of A Toxa Pequena, which is located about 100 metres east of A Toxa Grande.

== Etymology ==
The name Toxa has been explained as a pre-Roman hydronym derived from the Indo-European base *Tŭg-, more precisely *Tŭgia "muddy place", in reference to the therapeutic mud of the thermal springs that characterise the island of A Toxa. This reference hides the etymology of Louxo, the other name of the island, which since the middle of the 20th century is derived from Lausio, from the Indo-European root *leu-, *lau- "to wash, to wash oneself", in reference to its very ancient thermal springs.

== History ==
For centuries, the island was used by the inhabitants of O Grove as a place to graze their cattle (which they transported by boat) and also for their agricultural work. But following the rediscovery in the 19th century of its thermal mud (from which it takes the name A Toxa) and medicinal waters (from which it takes the name Louxo), it became privately owned to exploit its thermal advantages, building the old spa, which brought with it a spectacular increase in tourism and the birth of other facilities.

In 1989, the island hosted the annual meeting of the Bilderberg influence group, which brings together the political and financial elites of the wider world.

== Spa centre ==
It is one of the most famous islands in Galicia due to its vocation as a spa, leisure and tourism centre: it has thermal baths, old soap and cosmetics factories, luxury hotels, a golf course, a marina, a congress centre, the first casino in Spain, tennis courts, padel courts, archery courts, swimming pools, housing estates, a shopping centre and other facilities. However, the centre of the island still retains a dense pine forest. Thus, the island is divided into : 32 hectares of private housing estates (its southern part and the eastern and western flanks), 25 hectares of golf course for private use (its entire northern part) and 25 hectares of virgin pine forest (in the centre of the island).

== Chapel ==
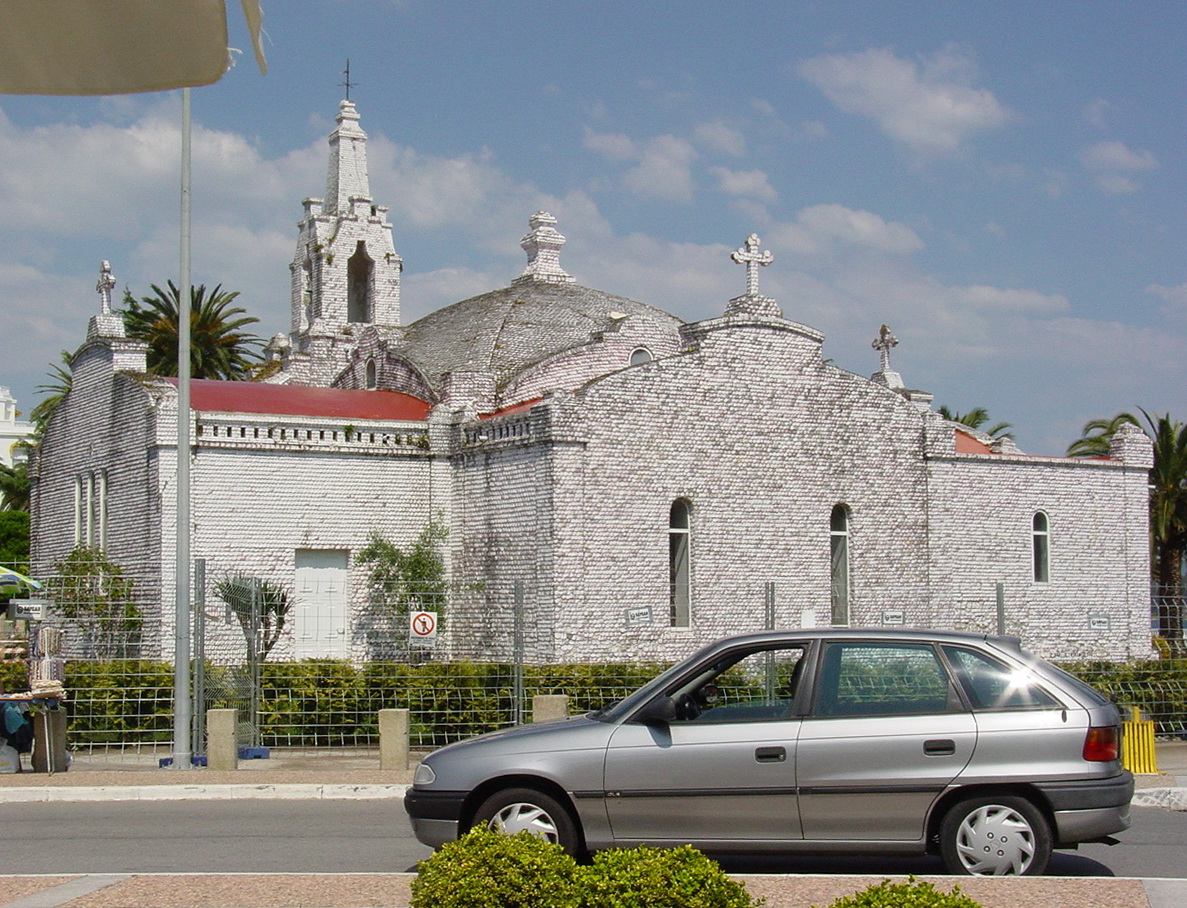
St. Sebastian's chapel

The island has a characteristic chapel dedicated to Saint Caralampio and the Virgin of Carmen, whose original plan dates back to the 12th century and which is now completely covered with scallops.

== Tourism ==
On this island, there are several recreational opportunities, including boating along the ria. The boats are catamarans whose keels are fitted with a special glass so that the marine fauna can be seen. On the route, a mussel farm is visited and its operation for cultivating mussels is explained.

The island Gran Hotel is a good architectural example of the Belle Époque style.

== Gallery ==
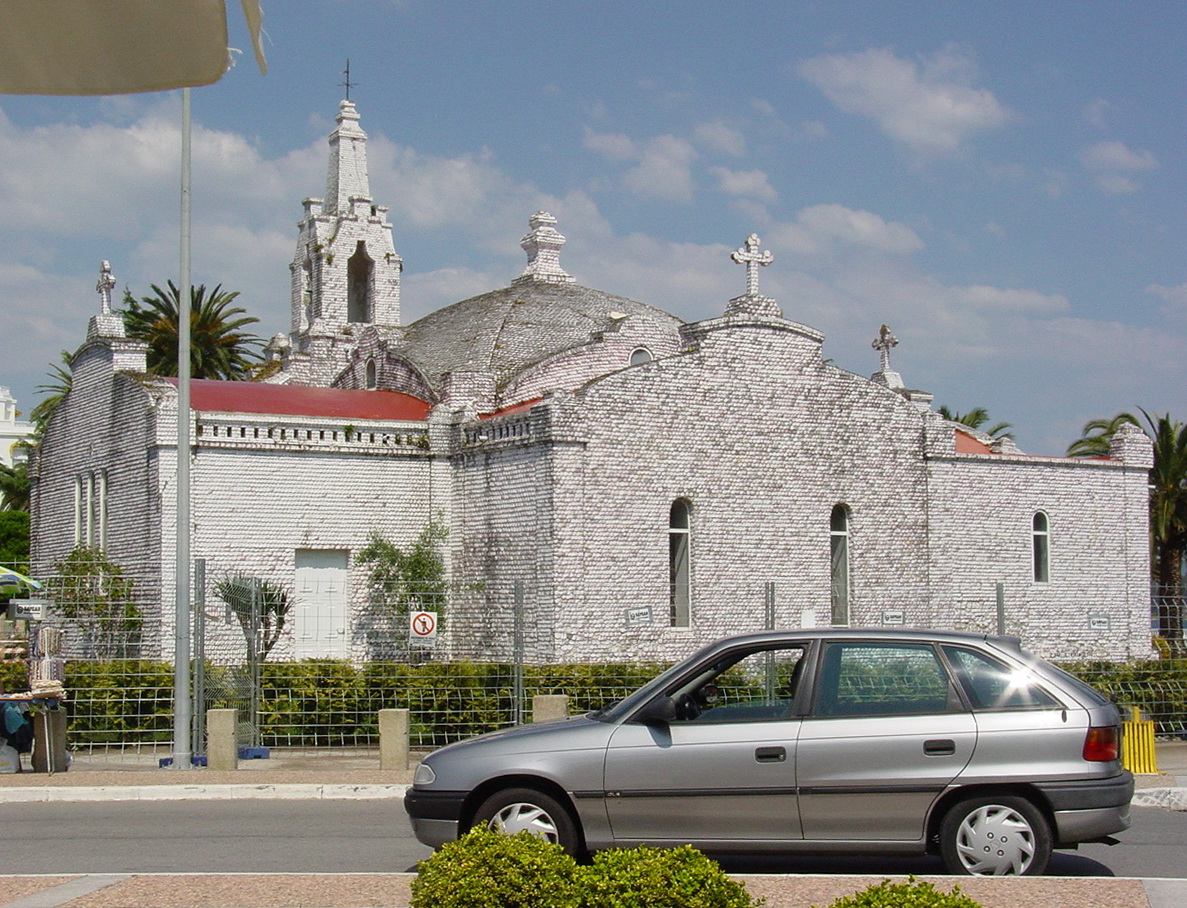
Chapel covered with scallops

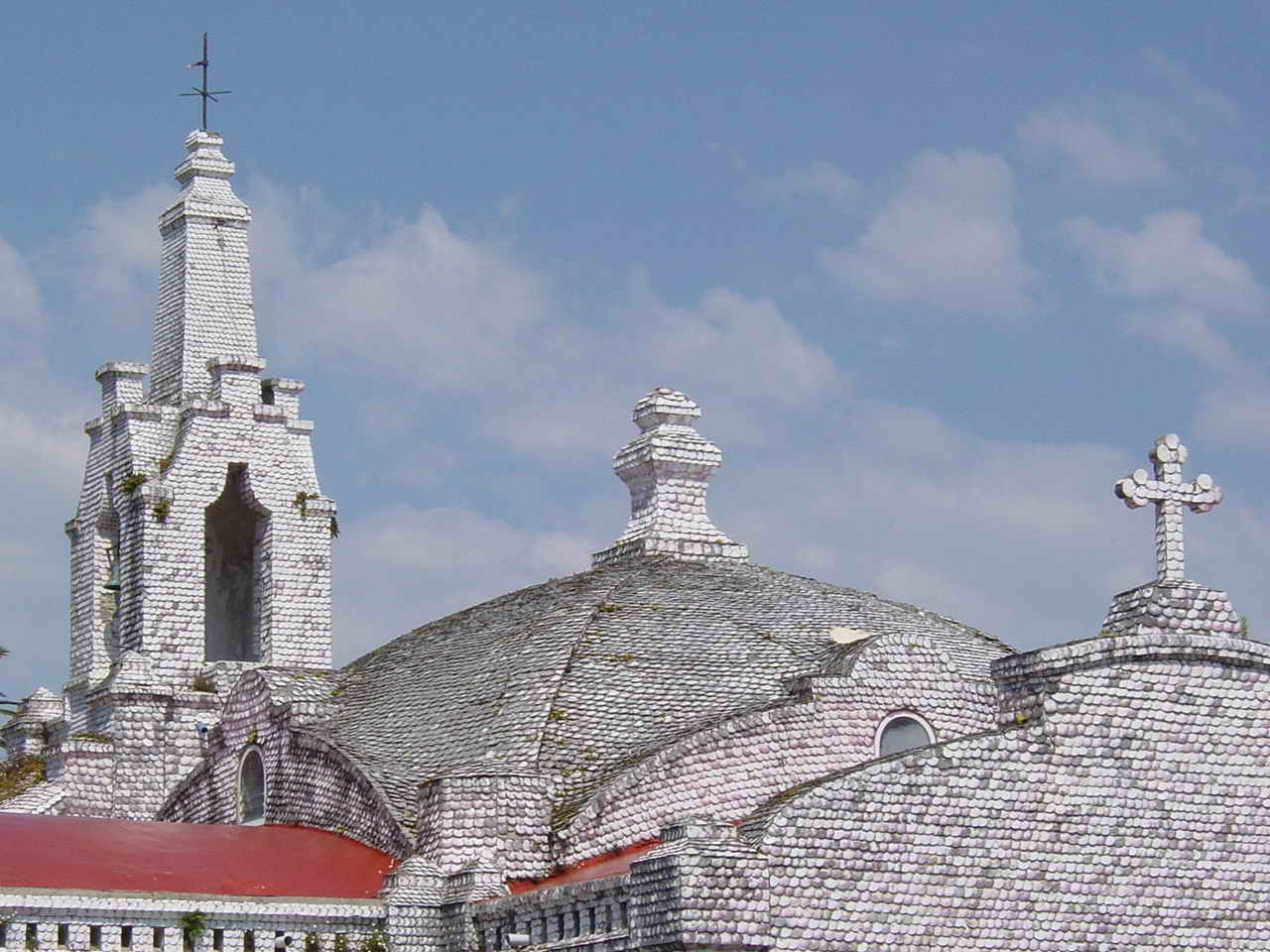
Detail of the chapel

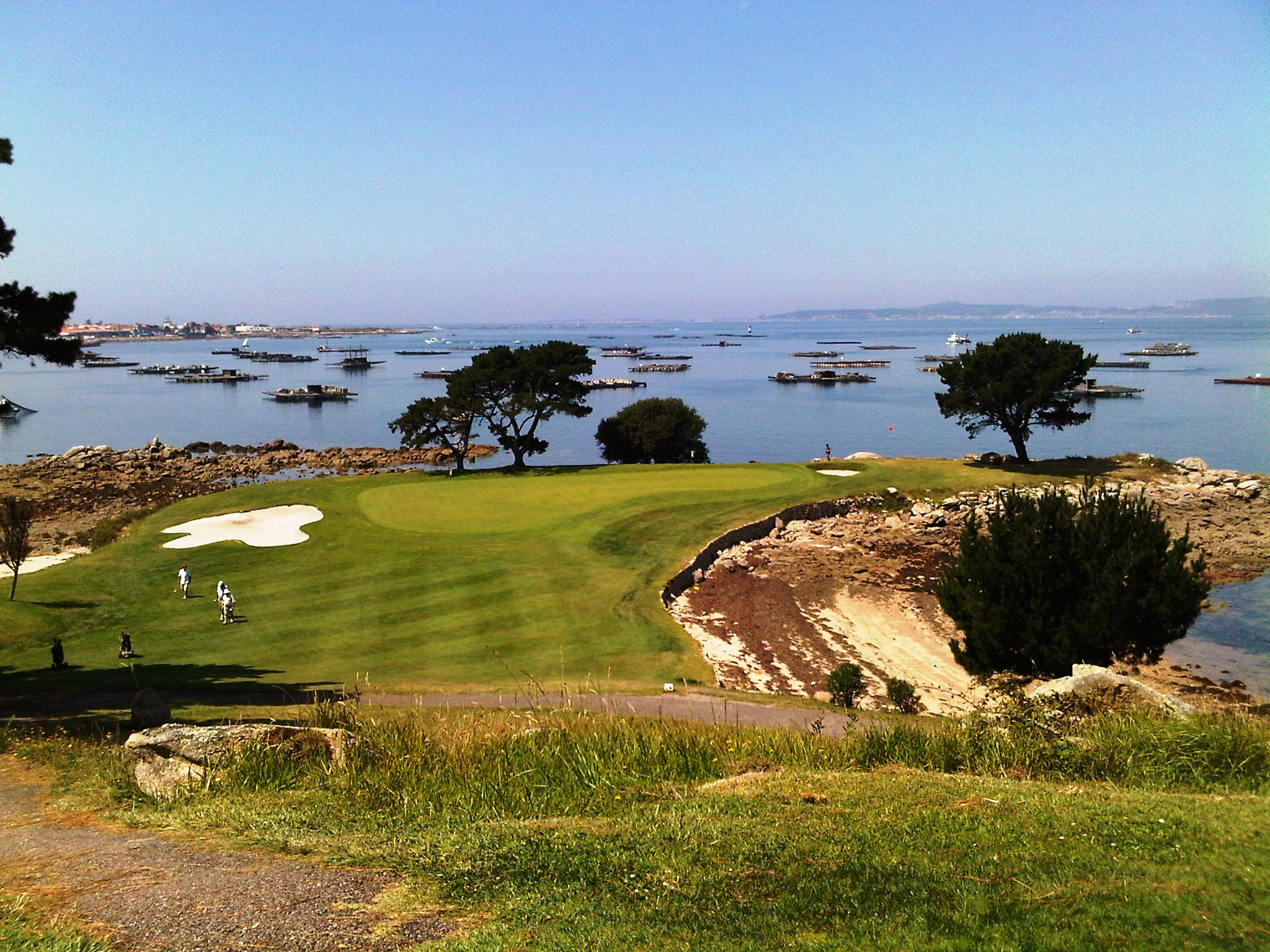
Golf course

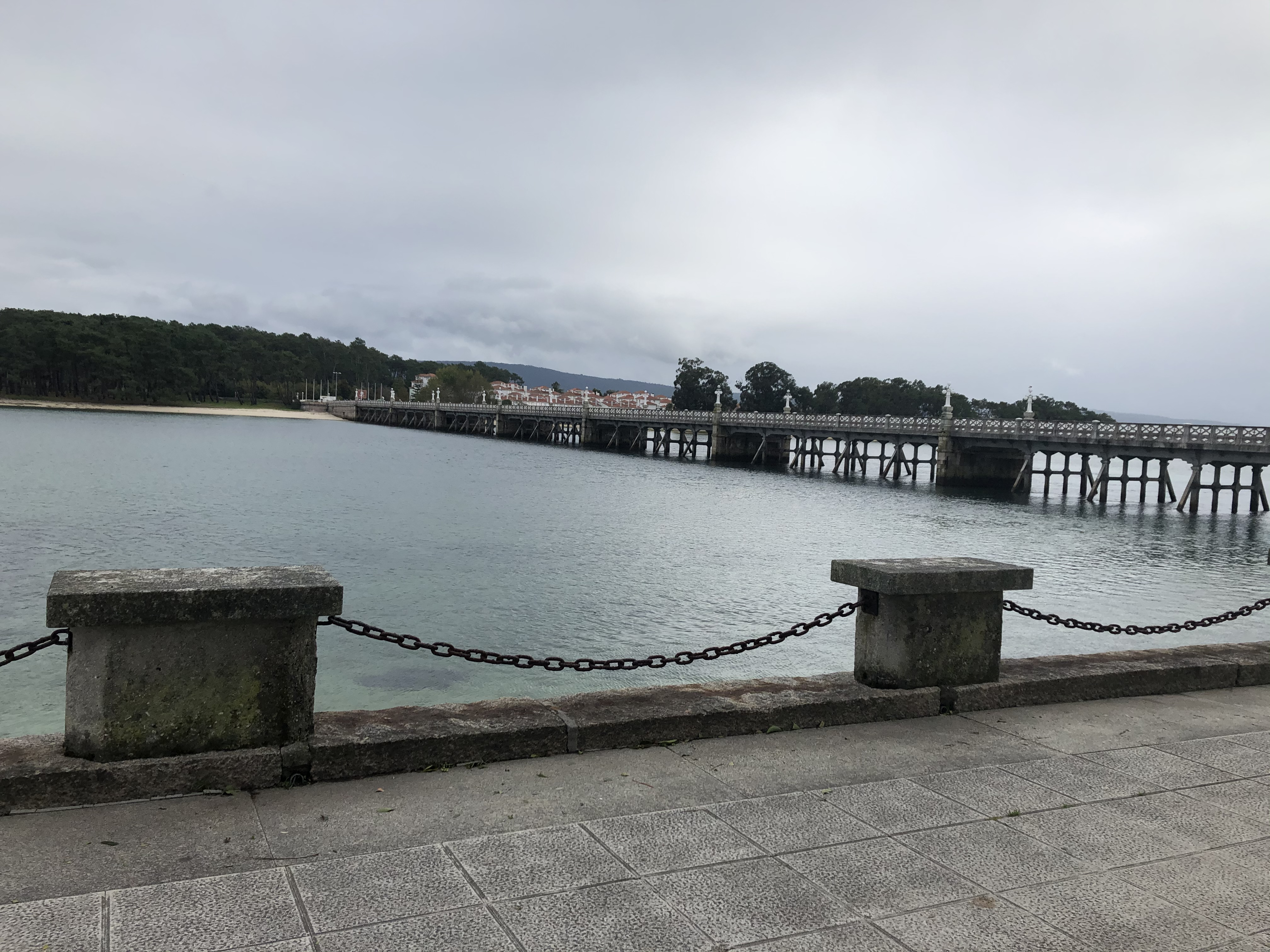
Bridge of A Toxa

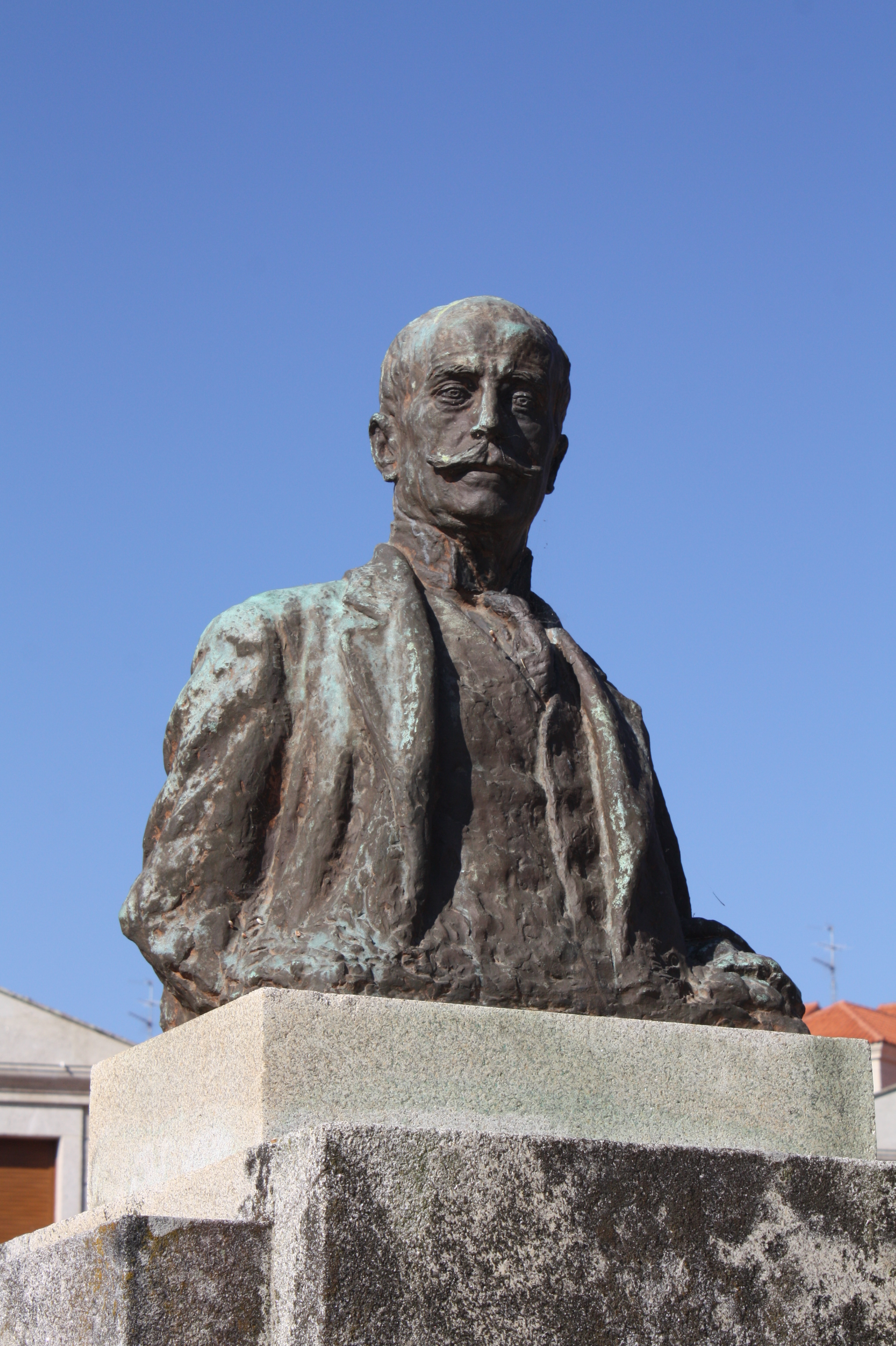
Marquis of Riestra on the island

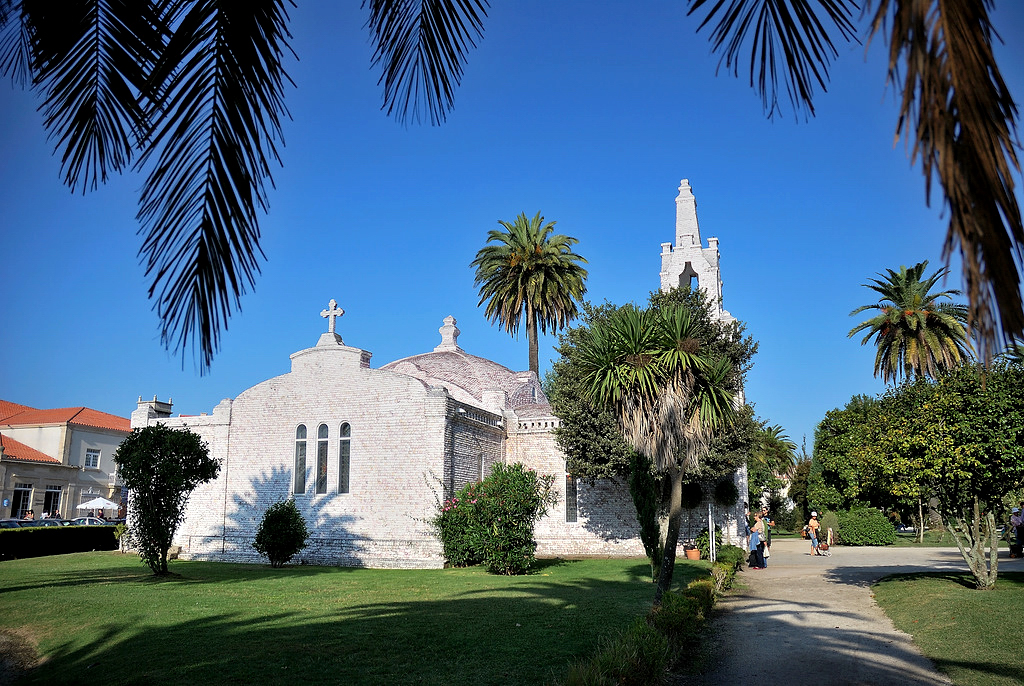
Chapel

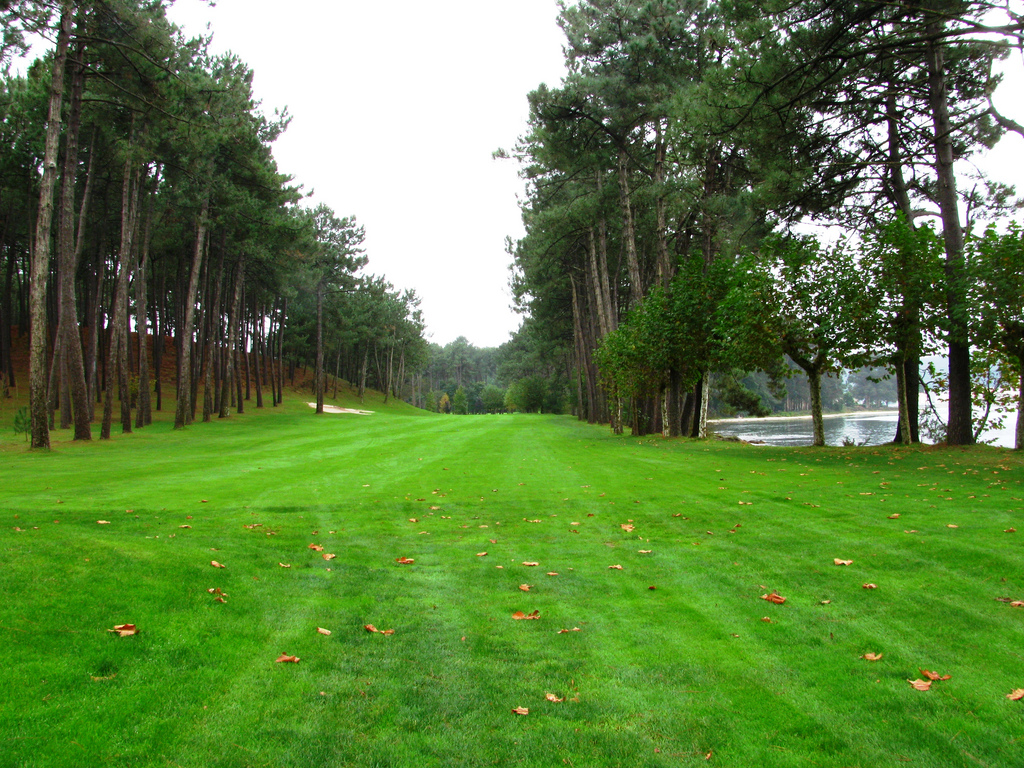
Golf club

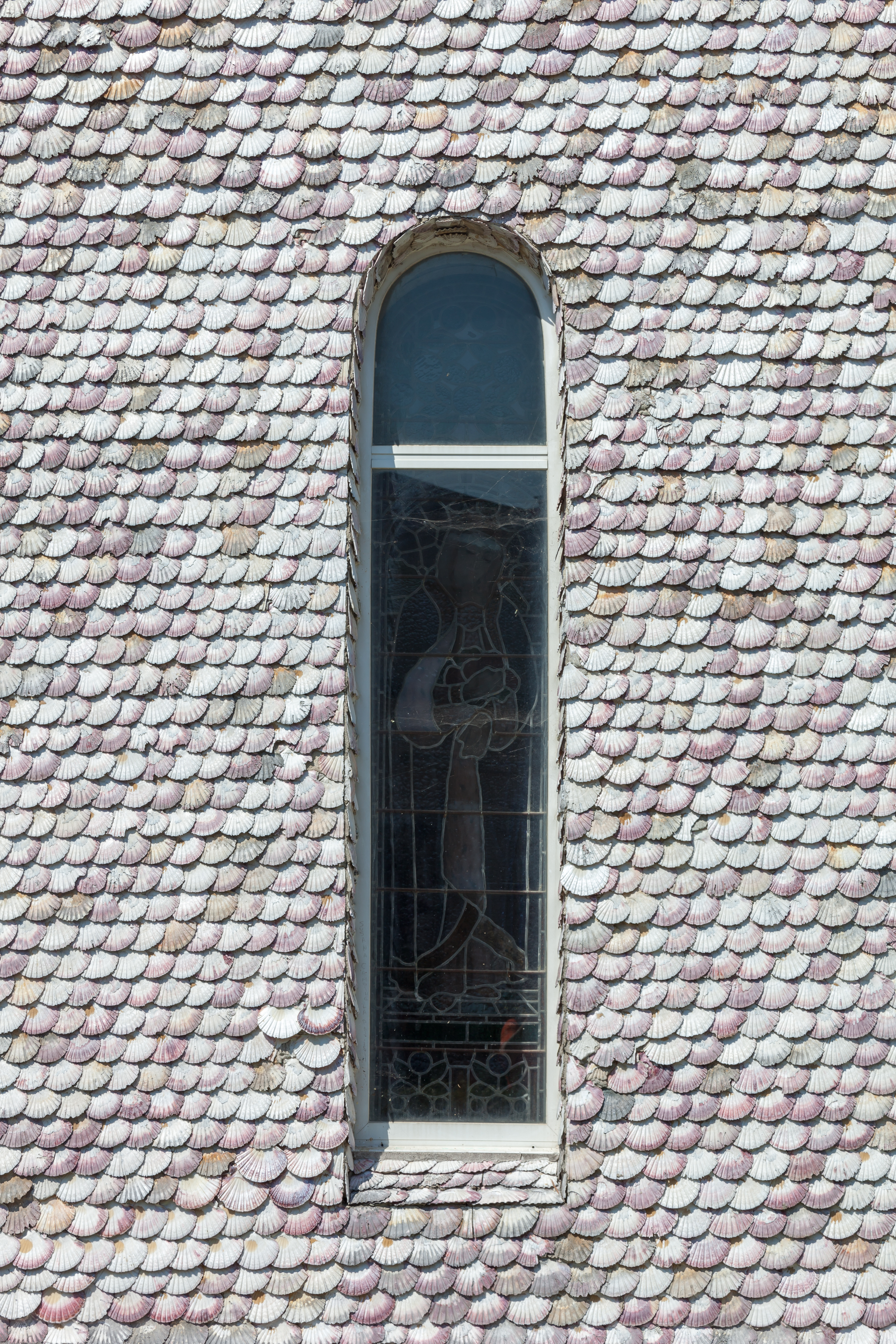
Detail of the chapel

== See also ==
=== Related articles ===
- Province of Pontevedra
- Rías Baixas
- Balneario da Toxa
- Spa town
- Thermal bath
