= Alegranza =

Uninhabited Spanish island in the Atlantic Ocean

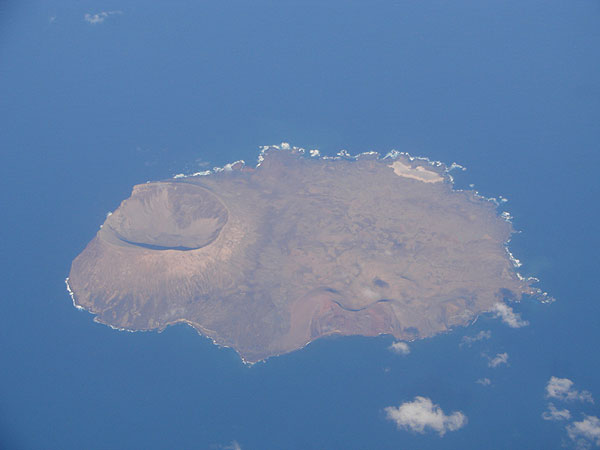
- An aerial view of Alegranza

- Location in the province of Las Palmas Alegranza (Canary Islands) Alegranza (Spain, Canary Islands)

Geography
- Coordinates: 29.399°N 13.512°W
- Archipelago: Chinijo Archipelago
- Area: 10.202 km^{2} (3.939 sq mi)
- Highest elevation: 289 m (948 ft)

Administration
- Spain
- Autonomous Community: Canary Islands
- Province: Las Palmas
- Municipality: Teguise

Demographics
- Population: 0 (2013)

Alegranza (Spanish pronunciation: [aleˈɣɾanθa]) is an uninhabited island in the Atlantic Ocean, located off the coast of Africa and is in the province of Las Palmas in the Canary Islands, Spain. It is the northernmost point in the Canary Islands, and part of the Chinijo Archipelago. The island is part of the municipality of Teguise on Lanzarote.

== Geographical overview ==
The area is 10.2 km². The island features a volcano with a crater of about 1.1 km in diameter and an altitude of 289 m. The second highest is Montaña de Lobos at 256 m and following La Rapagura. The northern portion is mainly flat.

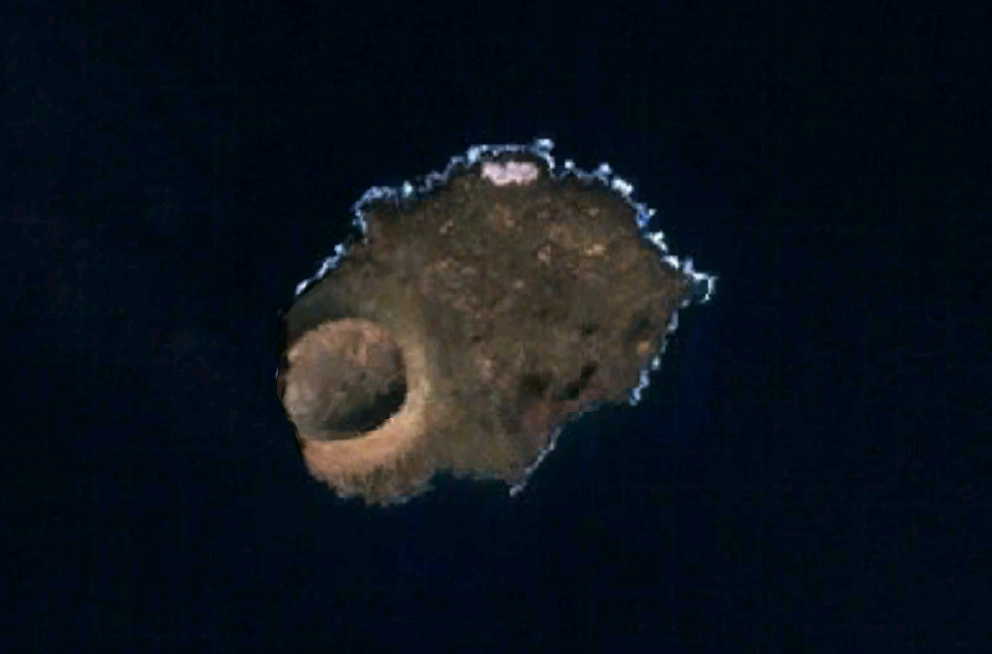
NASA satellite image of Alegranza

== Conservation ==
The island is part of the Chinijo Archipelago Natural Park (Parque Natural del Archipiélago Chinijo).

The Punta Delgada Lighthouse is located in the eastern part of Alegranza. The lighthouse was built between 1861 and 1865 and was designated a historic monument (Bien de Interés Cultural) in 2002.

== History ==
Its name, derived from the Spanish word for "joy," was given, according to some scholars, by Jean de Bethencourt because he felt joy upon spotting land. The island has been owned by the Jordán-Martinón family since the 1940s.

== In Fiction ==
- Alegranza is the setting of the 2022 Japanese animated film Mobile Suit Gundam: Cucuruz Doan's Island.

== See also ==
- Geology of the Canary Islands
