= Isla de Santa Catalina =

Island in Spain

Coordinates: 35°54′N 5°17′W

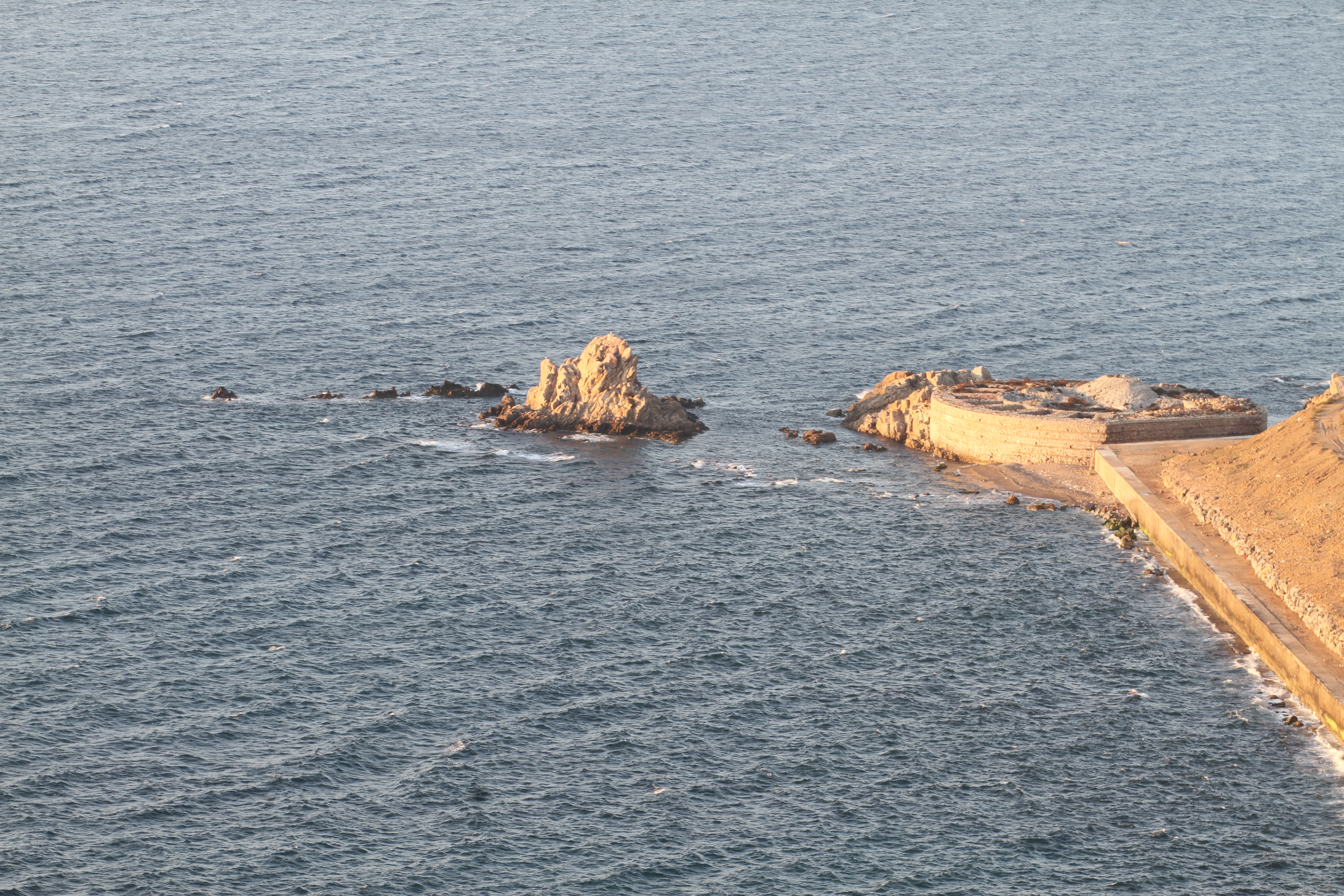
Santa Catalina island

Santa Catalina is a small island off the north coast of the Península de Almina in Ceuta, Spain.
