= Montaña Clara =

Uninhabited Spanish island

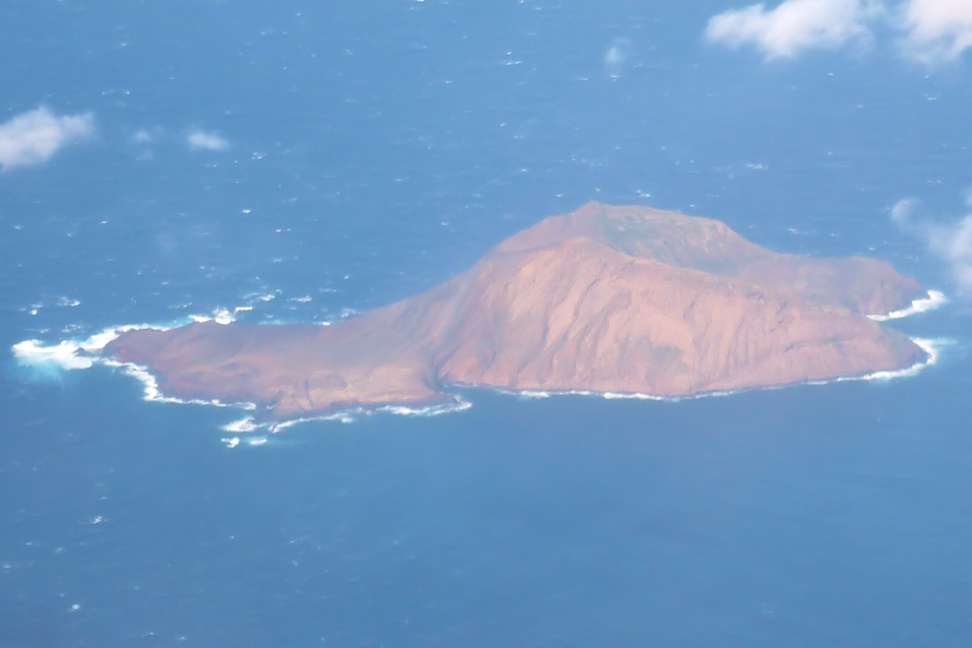
- Montaña Clara Island

- Location with Lanzarote Montaña Clara (Province of Las Palmas) Montaña Clara (Canary Islands) Montaña Clara (Spain, Canary Islands)

Geography
- Coordinates: 29.299°N 13.535°W
- Archipelago: Chinijo Archipelago
- Area: 1.33 km^{2} (0.51 sq mi)
- Highest elevation: 256 m (840 ft)

Administration
- Spain
- Autonomous Community: Canary Islands
- Province: Las Palmas
- Municipality: Teguise

Demographics
- Population: 0 (2013)

Montaña Clara (pronounced [monˈtaɲa ˈklaɾa]) (Spanish meaning "light-colored mountain") is a small uninhabited islet belonging to the Chinijo Archipelago, in the northeastern part of the Canary Islands, only a short distance (about 2 km (1.2 mi)) northwest of La Graciosa. The islet area is only 1.33 km^{2}. The highest point of the island is 256 m (840 ft) above sea level.

Being a refuge for marine birds, the island is part of the integral nature reserve Los Islotes, which is part of the natural park Chinijo Archipelago. In August 2007 the island was offered for sale by the heirs to the last owner, Mariano López Socas, who was mayor of a small Lanzarote town, for 9 million euros.

== See also ==
- Geology of the Canary Islands
