= Strait of El Río =

El Río
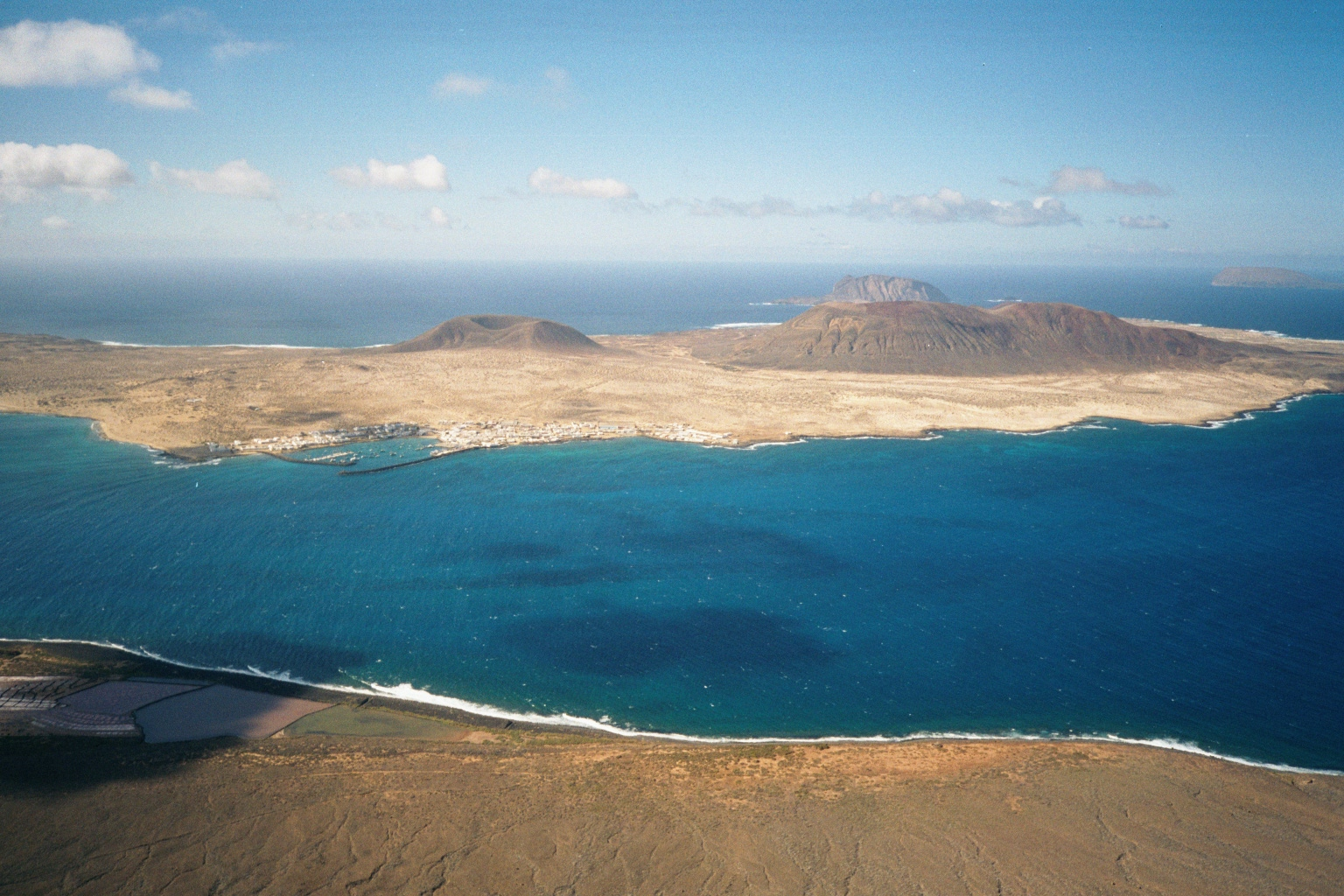
- La Graciosa seen from Lanzarote across the strait of El Río

- Location within Lanzarote
- Location: Between Lanzarote and La Graciosa
- Coordinates: 29°13′19″N 13°30′02″W
- Type: Strait
- Etymology: the river
- Ocean/sea sources: Atlantic Ocean
- Basin countries: Spain
- Designation: Part of the marine reserve established around La Graciosa and the islets north of Lanzarote
- Min. width: 1.1 km (0.68 mi; 0.59 nmi)
- Settlements: Caleta de Sebo

El Río (Spanish: Estrecho del Río) is the name given to the sea strait that separates La Graciosa from Lanzarote in the Canary Islands. Río, in Spanish, means 'river'. At its narrowest point, the strait is just over 1.1 kilometres (0.68 mi; 0.59 nmi) wide.

El Río is part of the marine reserve established around La Graciosa and the islets north of Lanzarote.

== Points of Interest ==
Caleta de Sebo is located on the strait's northwestern shore. It is the larger one of only two settlements on the island of La Graciosa.

Overlooking the strait from the southeastern shore are the cliffs of Famara, on the island of Lanzarote.

One of local artist César Manrique's creations, Mirador del Río, consists of a viewpoint located at a height of 400 metres (1,300 ft) on the cliffs of Famara. The viewpoint overlooks onto La Graciosa and the rest of the Chinijo Archipelago across the strait of El Río, after which the viewpoint is named.

The Salinas del Río are located at the feet of the cliffs of Famara along the shore of El Río. Believed to be the oldest salt evaporation ponds in the Canary Islands, the salt pans fell out of use in the second half of the twentieth century. They are, as of 2018, under restoration.

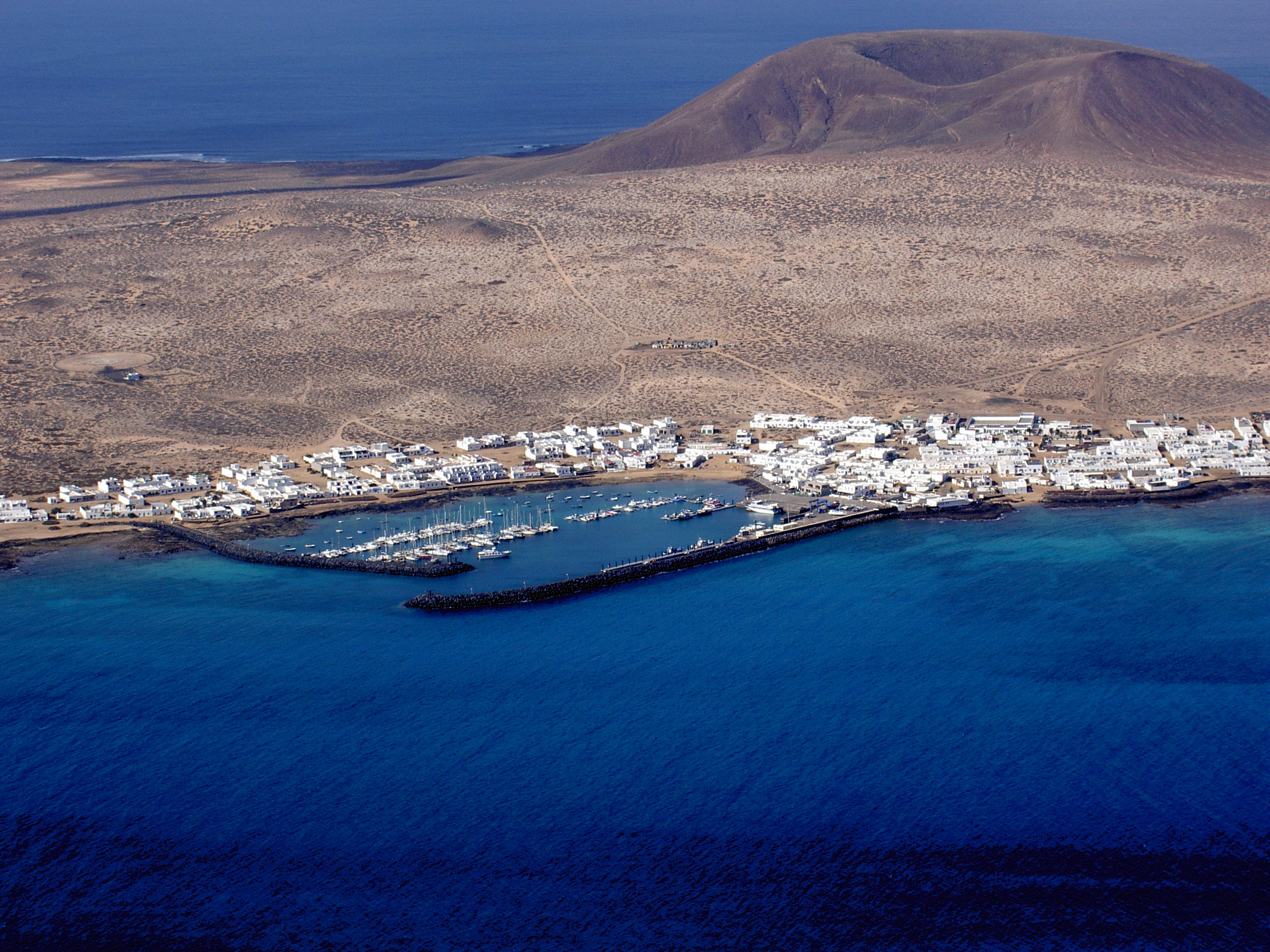
Caleta de Sebo

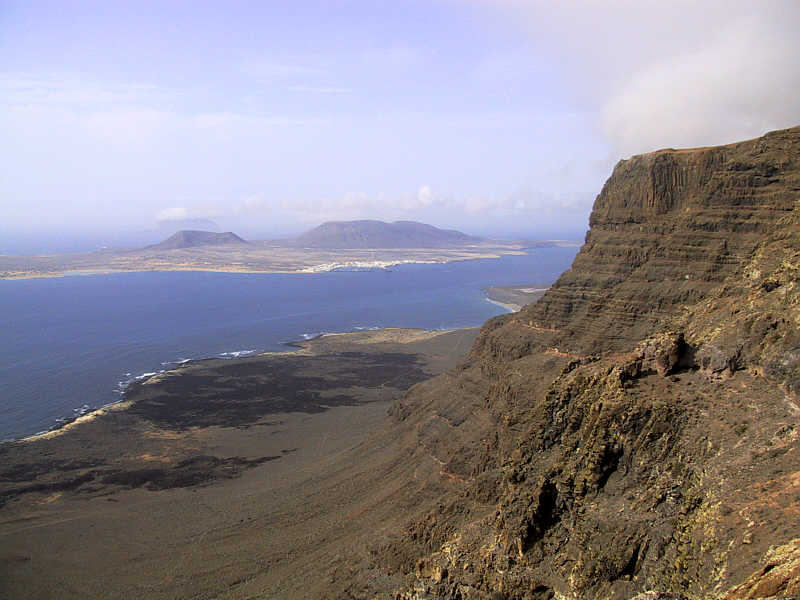
Cliffs of Famara

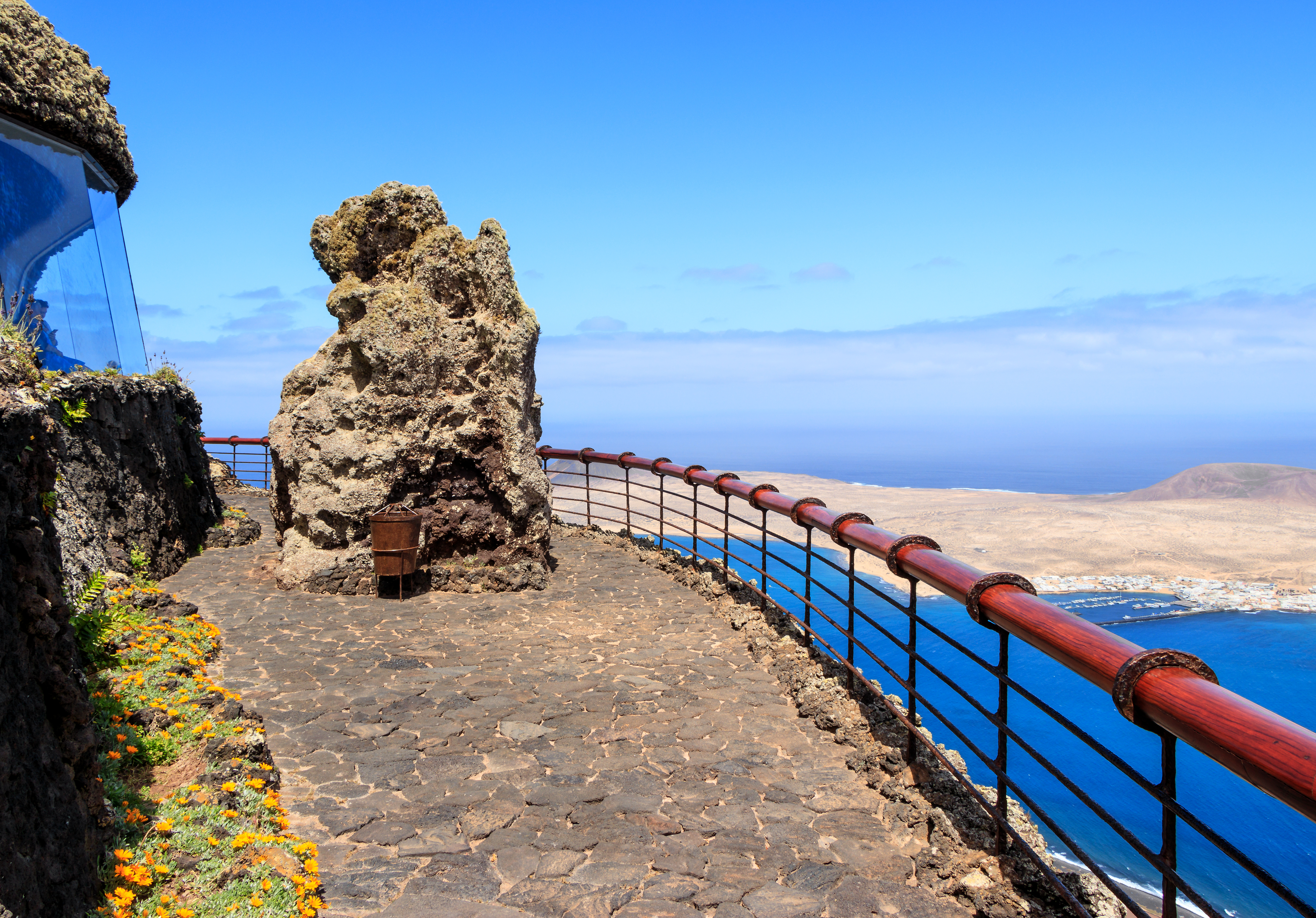
Mirador del Río

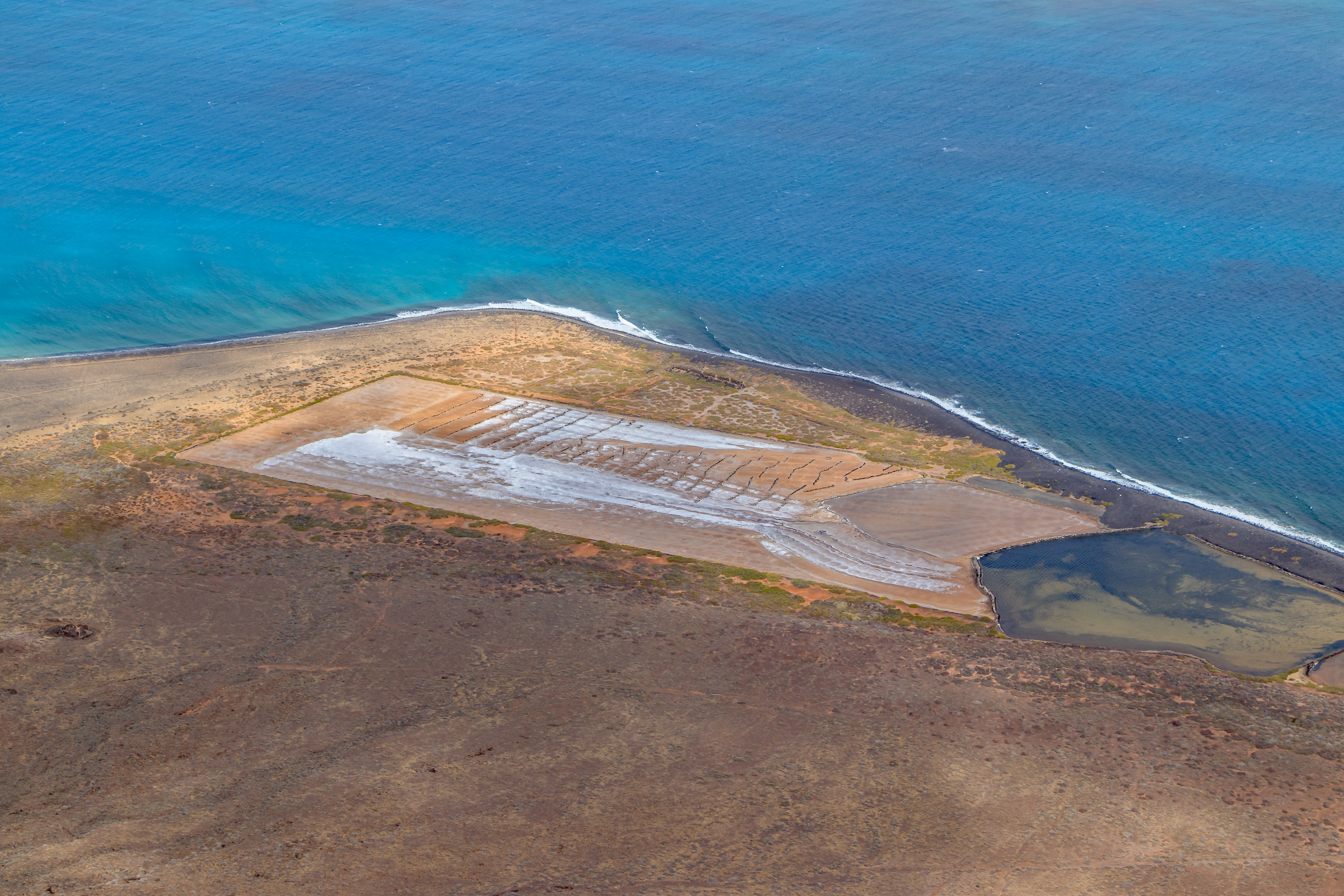
Salinas del Río

== Ferries ==
The only way to get to the island of La Graciosa is by ferry from Lanzarote. Ferries depart Lanzarote from the port of Órzola and head into the strait of El Río to reach the port of Caleta de Sebo on La Graciosa.

As of July 2019, two ferry companies operate this service, both based on La Graciosa: Líneas Romero and Biosfera Express. Travel time is about 25 minutes.

== Open Water Swimming ==
The Travesía a nado "El Río" is an annual open water swimming event that crosses the strait. The start line is Playa de Bajo Risco on Lanzarote and the finish line is the dock at Caleta de Sebo on La Graciosa, covering a distance of 2,600 metres (8,500 ft). The event first took place in September 1993 and has been organised every year since then, in either September or October depending on the tides.
