= Playa de la Cocina =

Beach in Lanzarote, Spain

Playa de la Cocina is a beach on La Graciosa island, part of the municipality of Teguise in Lanzarote, Spain. It is situated near the southwestern point of the island, in a little bay at the foot of the Montaña Amarilla. It is a 10 minutes walk from Playa Francesa in the southwest of the Caleta de Sebo village. The beach's average width is 10 meters and length is 100 metres.

The beach is used for swimming, snorkeling and sunbathing. Playa de la Cocina is accessible by about an hours walk from Caleta del Sebo. Along with Playa de las Conchas Playa de la Cocina is known as one of the "most beautiful beaches in the Canary Islands".

Playa de la Cocina is part of a marked coastal hiking route described by Spain’s National Parks Network (Red de Parques Nacionales), which connects several southern beaches of La Graciosa, including Playa del Salado and Playa Francesa.
