= Casas de Pedro Barba =

Pedro Barba
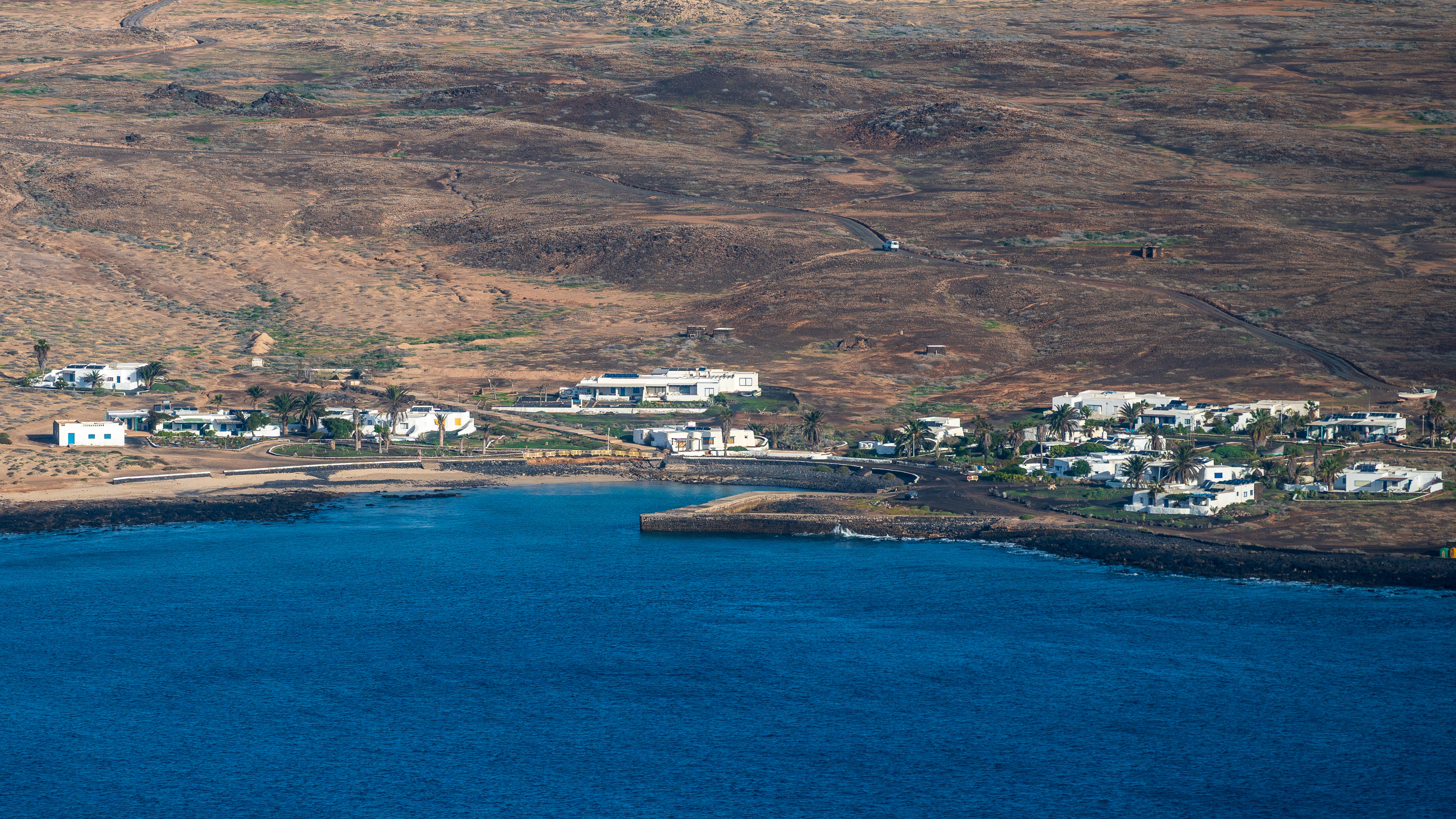

- Location within Lanzarote Location within Canary Islands
- Coordinates: 29°15′41″N 13°28′48″W
- Country: Spain
- Autonomous Community: Canary Islands
- Province: Las Palmas
- Island: La Graciosa
- Municipality: Teguise

Population (1 January 2018)
  - Total: 3
- Time zone: UTC+00:00 (WET)
  - Summer (DST): UTC+01:00 (WEST)
- Postcode: 35540

Casas de Pedro Barba, or simply Pedro Barba, is a small community of summer residences on the island of La Graciosa, Canary Islands, Spain. Its population, as of 1 January 2018 and according to the Spanish Statistical Institute, is 3 inhabitants. It is part of the municipality of Teguise on the neighbouring island of Lanzarote. There are no asphalted roads on La Graciosa; a dirt track connects the settlement to the only other inhabited town on the island, Caleta de Sebo, from which a regular ferry service is offered to Lanzarote.

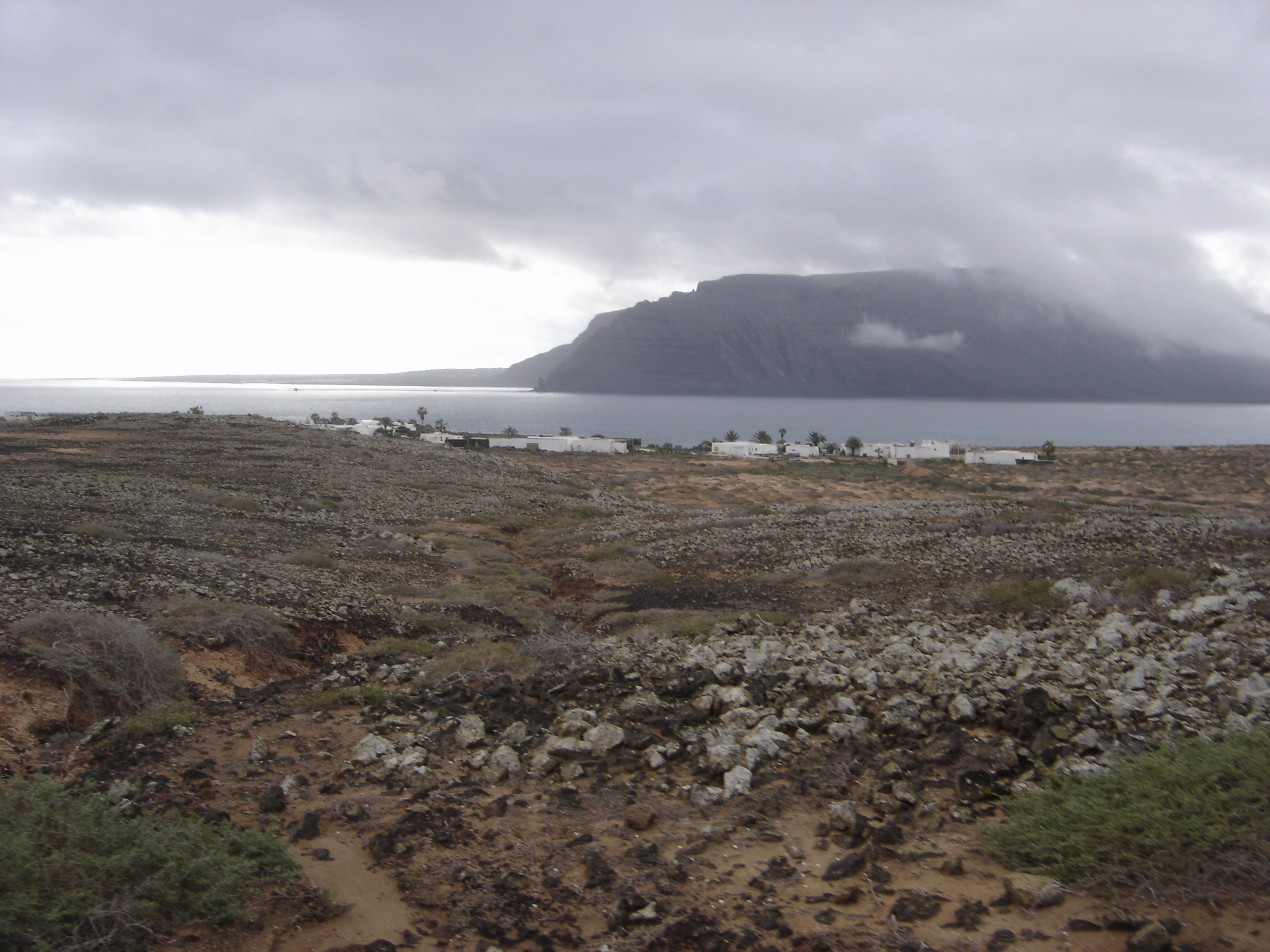
