= Mirador del Río =

Coordinates: 29°12′52″N 13°28′52″W

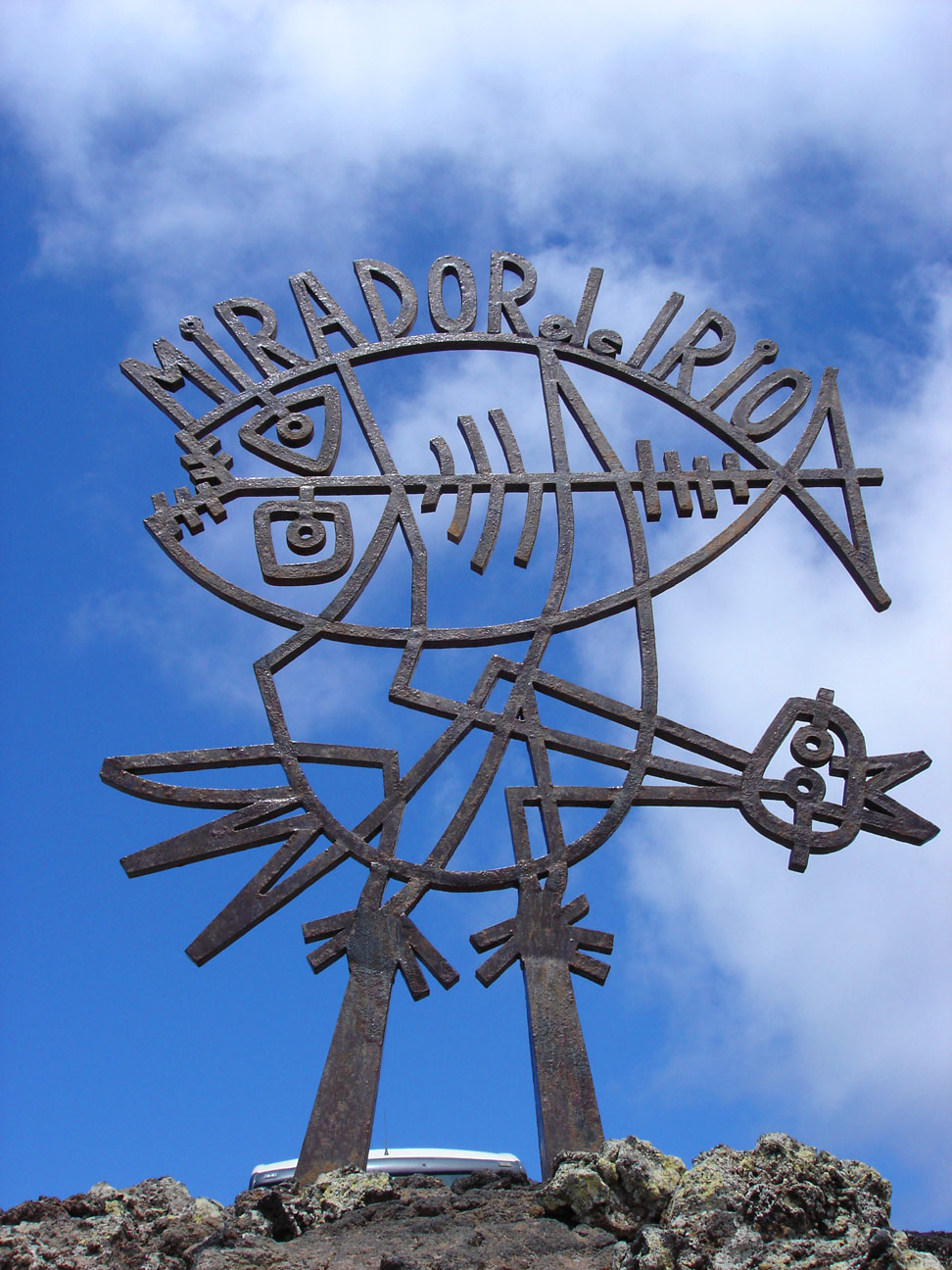
art work: logo of Mirador del Río

Mirador del Río is a viewpoint on an approximately 475-metre-high (1,560 ft) escarpment called Batería del Río in the north of the Canarian island of Lanzarote.

== History ==
The location was created in between 1971 and 1973 by the local artist César Manrique in his typical style, consisting of a balustraded cafe, a souvenir shop and a platform at the top which are integrated in the lava rock. The technical realization of the work was carried out by Eduardo Cáceres and Jesús Soto and it was inaugurated in 1973. Its surroundings have been declared a protected natural area. The building is barely visible from the outside due to being camouflaged under a heavy stone skin that blends in with the environment.

== Description ==
After entering the building through a winding corridor, there are two spacious vaulted rooms with two large glass windows—the eyes of the Mirador—that provide a panoramic view over the Strait of El Río towards the island of La Graciosa. Also, on clear days, beyond the view of La Graciosa, the small islands of Montaña Clara and Roque del Oeste can be seen, with the furthest of them all being Alegranza. All of these are part of the Chinijo Archipelago.

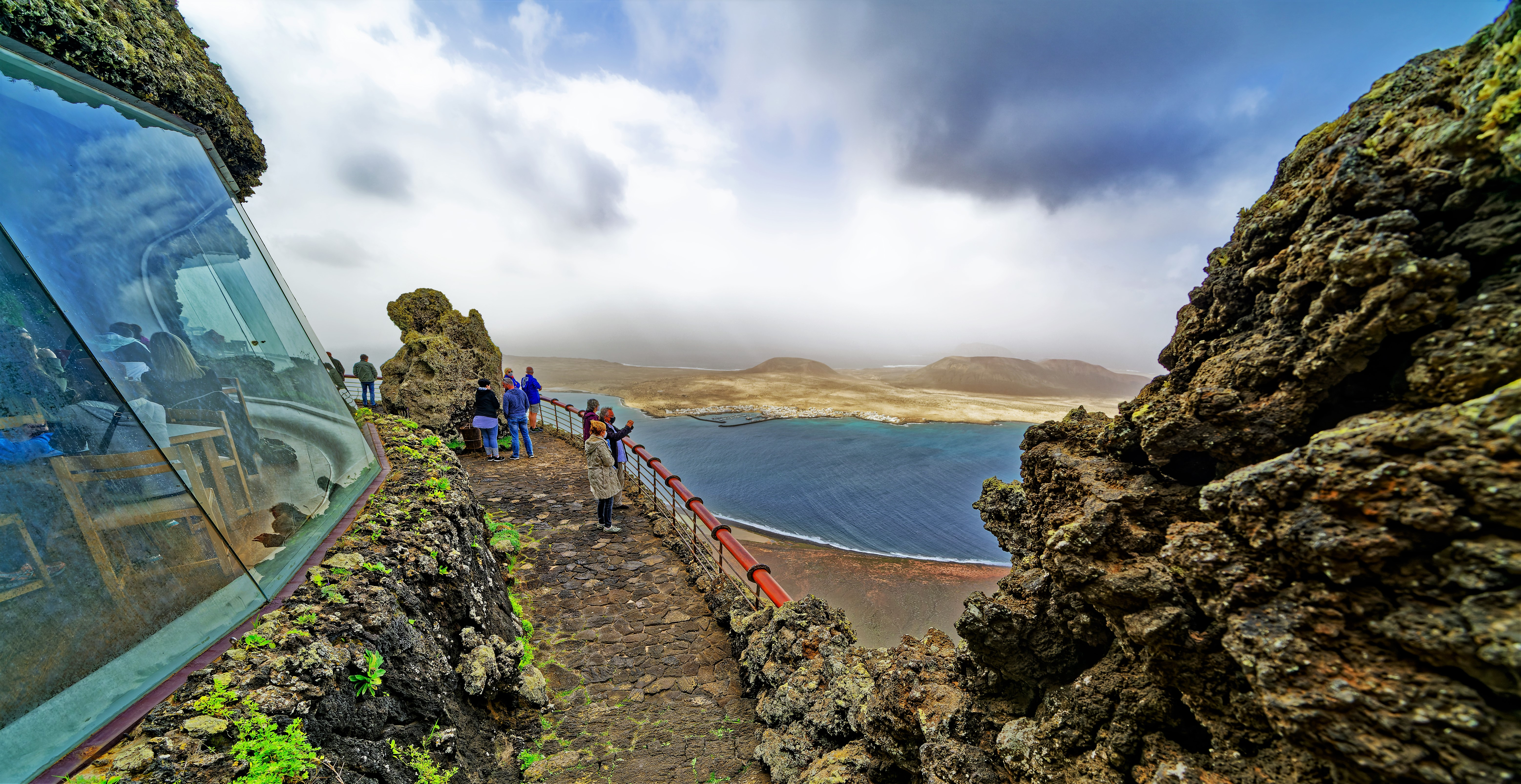
Mirador del Río

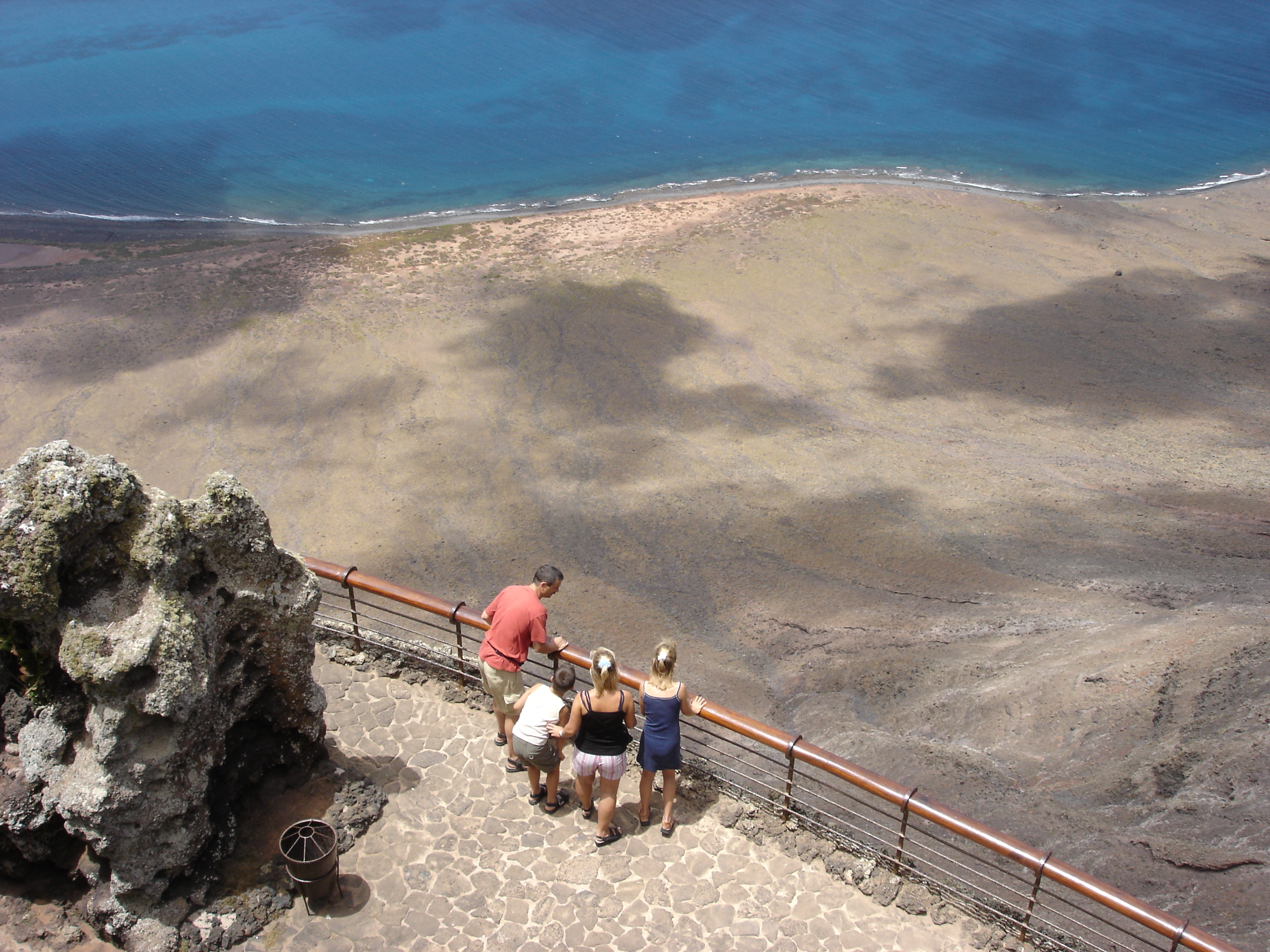
family watching the abyss

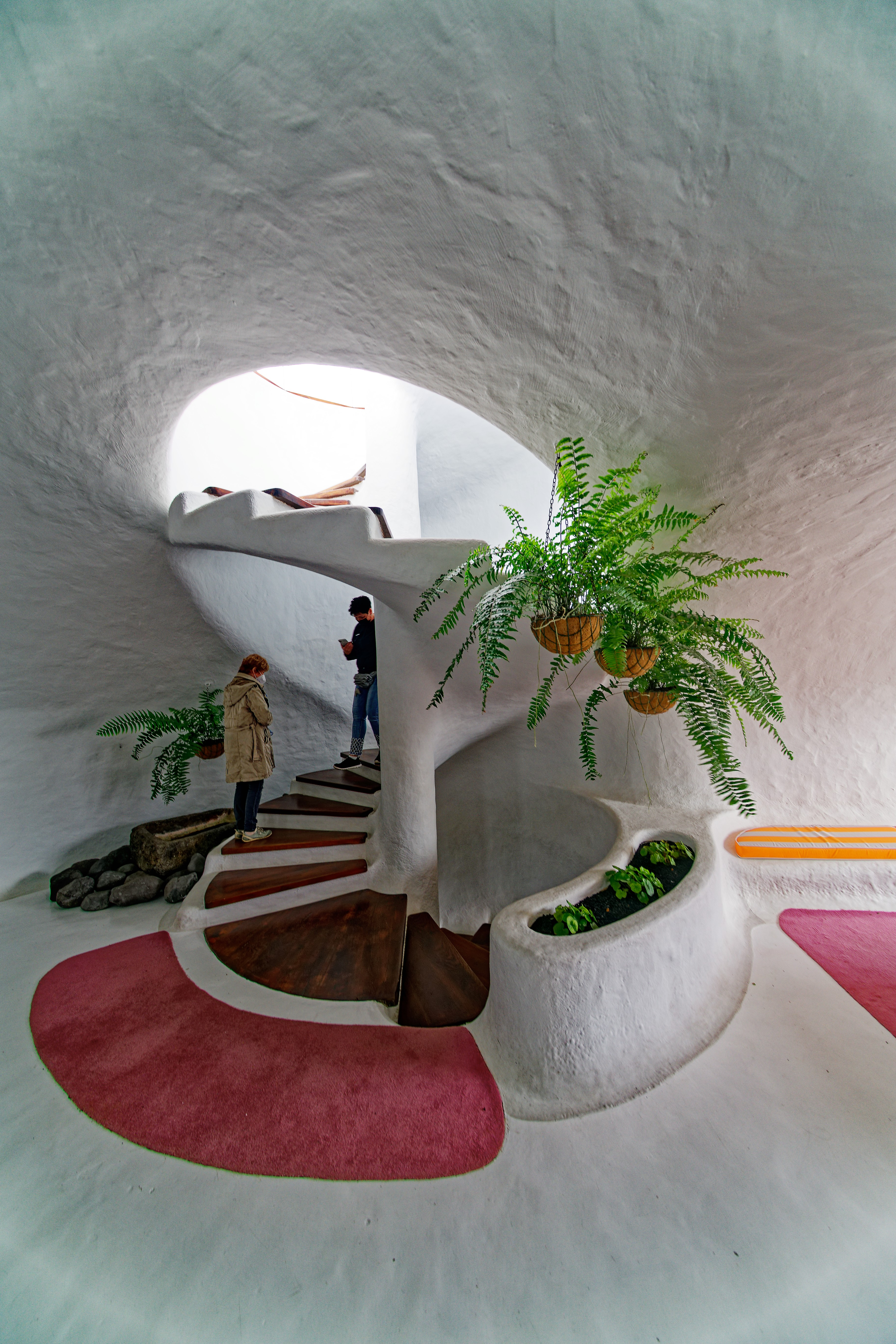
Staircase

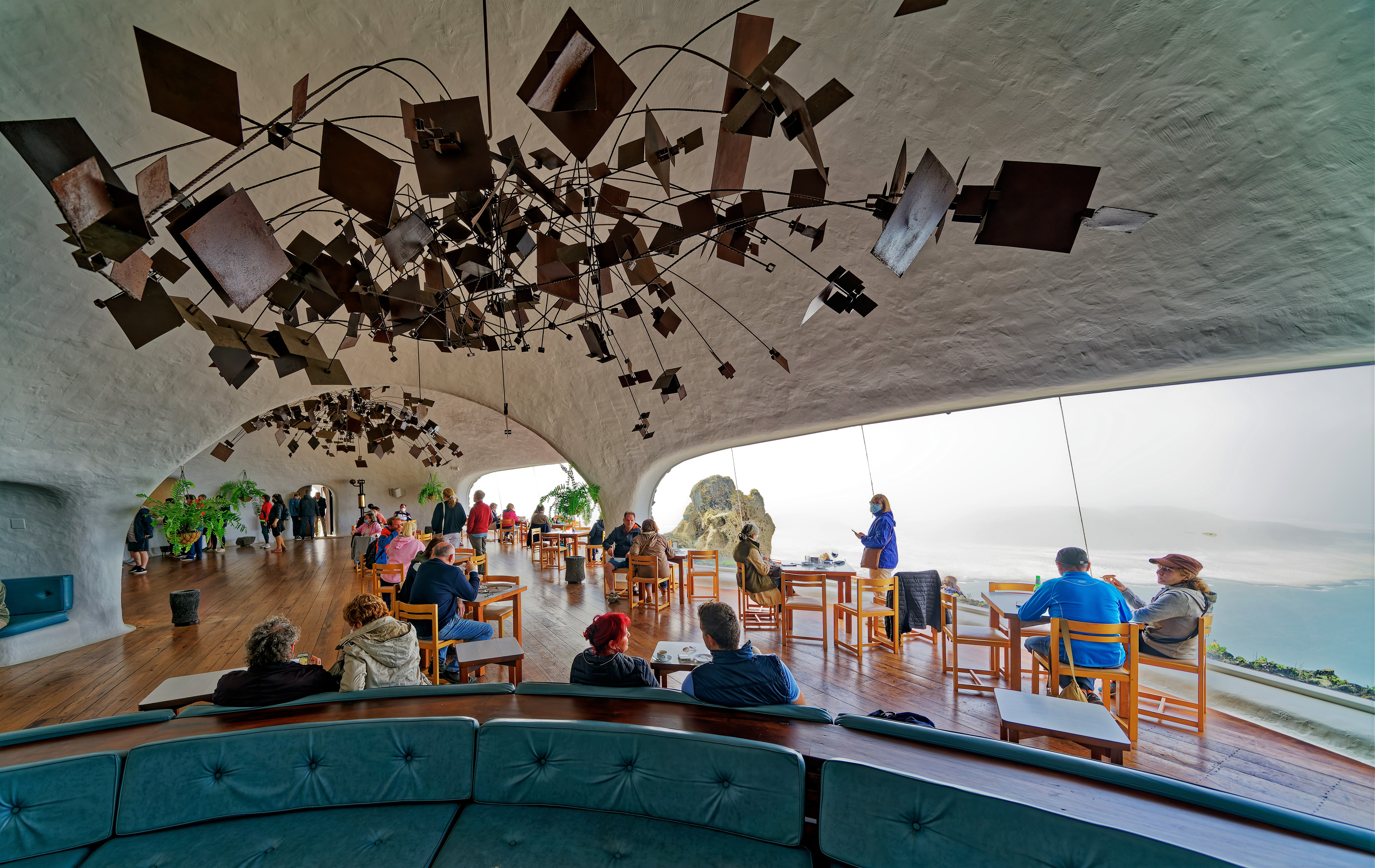
cafe at Mirador del Río
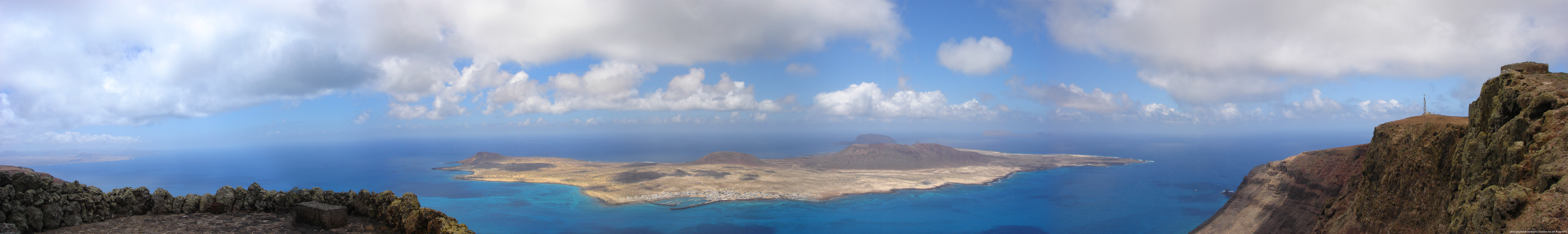
180° panorama photo taken from Mirador del Río showing La Graciosa
