= Demographics of the Canary Islands =

The Canary Islands are an archipelago, or island chain, in the Macaronesia region of the Atlantic Ocean off the coast of North Africa. They are one of 17 autonomous communities of Spain. The demographics of the Canary Islands are concentrated in the largest islands of Tenerife and Gran Canaria.

== Population ==
219 people/km^{2} with Tenerife and Gran Canaria accounting for more than 80% of the total population of all islands. There is a history of emigration from the islands to other cities and countries, such as Cuba and Venezuela. In recent years, the Canary population has increased due as emigrants have returned and newcomers have arrived to occupy new jobs. Spain's membership in the European Union is one major reason for this increase in prosperity and residence.

The 2005 census recorded 1,968,280 inhabitants, with 1,011,928 in the 33 municipalities of the province of Las Palmas, and 956,352 in the 52 municipalities the province of Santa Cruz de Tenerife.

The largest city by population is Las Palmas de Gran Canaria with 378,628 inhabitants, followed by the city of Santa Cruz de Tenerife with 221,567, San Cristóbal de La Laguna with 141,627 and Telde with 96,547.

=== Population by island ===
Population by island
island	population
Tenerife	898,680
Gran Canaria	838,397
Lanzarote	123,039
Fuerteventura	86,642
La Palma	85,252
La Gomera	21,746
El Hierro	10,477
La Graciosa	637
