= Gibberula estherae =

Scientific classification
- Kingdom: Animalia
- Phylum: Mollusca
- Class: Gastropoda
- Subclass: Caenogastropoda
- Order: Neogastropoda
- Family: Cystiscidae
- Subfamily: Cystiscinae
- Genus: Gibberula
- Species: G. estherae

Binomial name
- Gibberula estherae Ortea & Moro, 2017

Species of gastropod

Gibberula estherae is a species of marine gastropod in the family Cystiscidae. It is known from the Canary Islands.

== Distribution ==
This species occurs in the waters of the Canary Islands. The type specimens were obtained off Fuerteventura and Graciosa at depths of 15–25 m (49–82 ft).

== Description ==
The shell is smooth and translucent and measures about 1.5 mm–2.7 mm × 1 mm–1.85 mm (0.059 in–0.106 in × 0.039 in–0.073 in).
