= Soo, Lanzarote =

Coordinates: 29°05′55″N 13°37′15″W

Sóo is a village in the municipality of Teguise on the island of Lanzarote in the Canary Islands.
