= Costa Teguise =

- Town
- Location within Lanzarote Location within Canary Islands
- Coordinates: 28.999°N 13.502°W
- Country: Spain
- Autonomous Community: Canary Islands
- Province: Las Palmas
- Island: Lanzarote
- Municipality: Teguise

Population (1 January 2018)
  - Total: 8,306
- Time zone: UTC+00:00 (WET)
  - Summer (DST): UTC+01:00 (WEST)
- Postcode: 35508

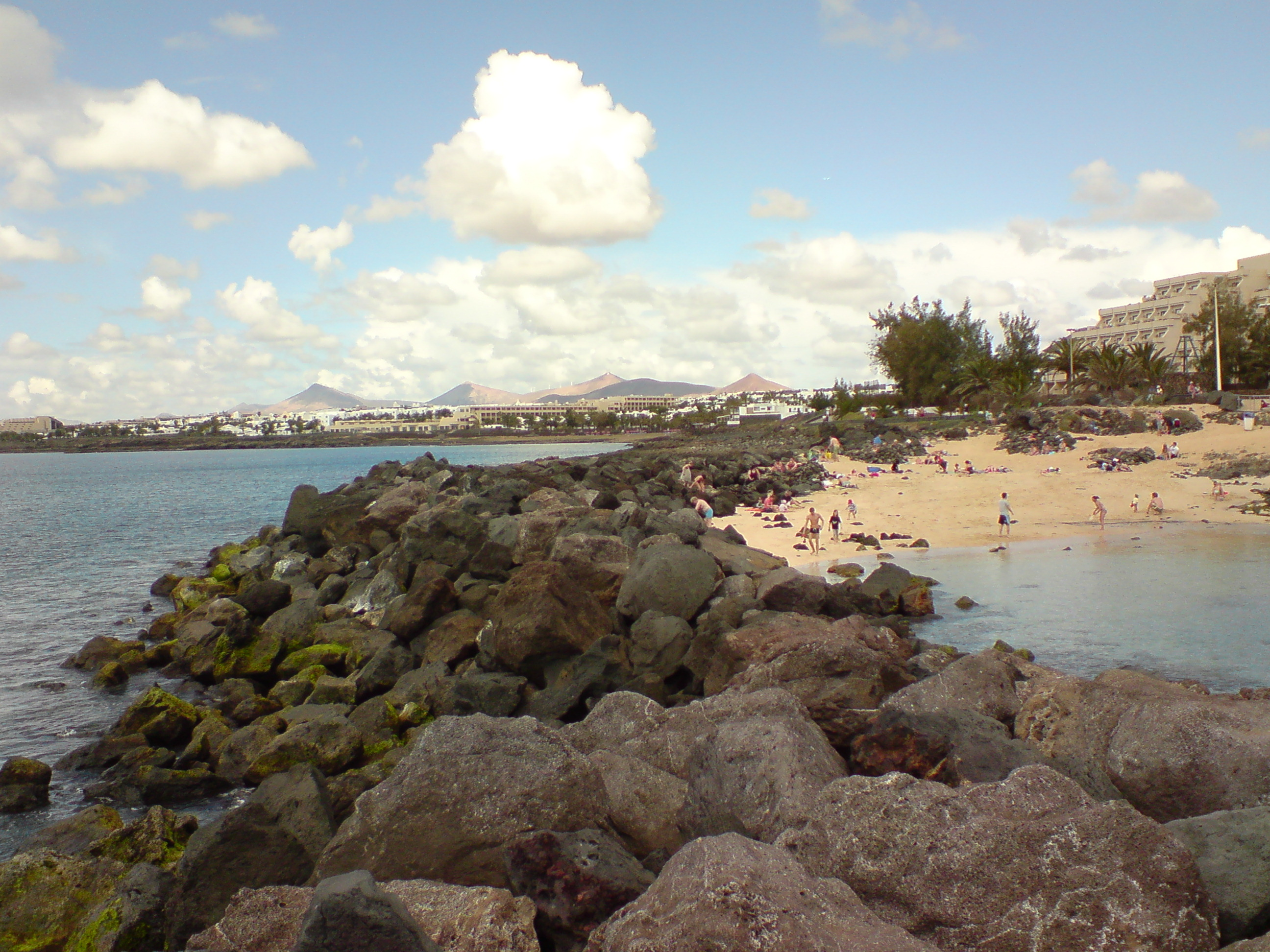
Playa del Jablillo in Costa Teguise

Costa Teguise is a coastal town in the Municipality of Teguise on the island of Lanzarote (in the Canary Islands of Spain). It was built intentionally to accommodate tourism, and prior to building commencing the streets were planned, constructed, and serviced in advance.

The town has four main beaches, all of which are natural: Playa de los Charcos, Playa de las Cucharas, Playa del Jablillo and Playa Bastián.

== History ==
The company Explosivos Río Tinto, then directed by Mr. Leopoldo Calvo-Sotelo, later President of the Government, bought a 12 million square meter property, in order to destine it to a high level tourist urbanization, which it baptized as "Urbanización Costa de Teguise", which was therefore planned from the beginning as a tourist nucleus of the island.

Construction began in 1970 with the first five-star hotel on Lanzarote, the Gran Meliá Salinas, designed by architect Fernando Higueras with the collaboration of local artist César Manrique. This has been followed by many other 4 and 5 star hotels.

== Beaches ==
Costa Teguise has four main beaches.

- Playa de las Cucharas is the biggest and the only one with toasted sand. It is well known for the practice of windsurfing, and each year a freestyle event of the PWA World Tour is held here.
- Playa de los Charcos is almost joined to Playa de las Cucharas but this one has white sand.
- Playa del Jablillo is the smallest and quietest beach of Costa Teguise. This is due to the breakwaters that, especially during low tide, almost form a natural pool. It is also white sand.
- Playa Bastián is further south of the town and is a mixture of white sand and small volcanic stones known as picón on the islands.

== Sport ==
=== Golf ===
Costa Teguise Golf was designed by John Harris and built in the late 1970s. For about 30 years it was the only golf course on Lanzarote until Lanzarote Golf was built in Puerto del Carmen. The course is integrated with the landscape of the island, taking advantage of the palm trees and the picón (black volcanic gravel) as part of the course.

== Transport ==
Public transport on the island of Lanzarote consists of a bus service provided by the company Arrecife Bus. The following lines connect Costa Teguise with the rest of the island:

- Line 01: Costa Teguise - Arrecife
- Line 03: Costa Teguise - Arrecife - Pto. del Carmen
- Line 11: Costa Teguise - Teguise market (Sundays only)
- Line 25: Costa Teguise - Arrecife - Pto. del Carmen - Puerto Calero

== Historical Population ==
Historical population
Year	Pop.	±%
2000	2,299	—
2001	2,663	+15.8%
2002	3,134	+17.7%
2003	3,468	+10.7%
2004	3,655	+5.4%
2005	4,433	+21.3%
2006	4,948	+11.6%
2007	5,713	+15.5%
2008	6,324	+10.7%
2009	6,740	+6.6%
2010	7,151	+6.1%
2011	7,629	+6.7%
2012	7,856	+3.0%
2013	7,876	+0.3%
2014	7,756	−1.5%
2015	7,981	+2.9%
2016	8,119	+1.7%
2017	8,205	+1.1%
2018	8,306	+1.2%
Source: INE

== Schools ==
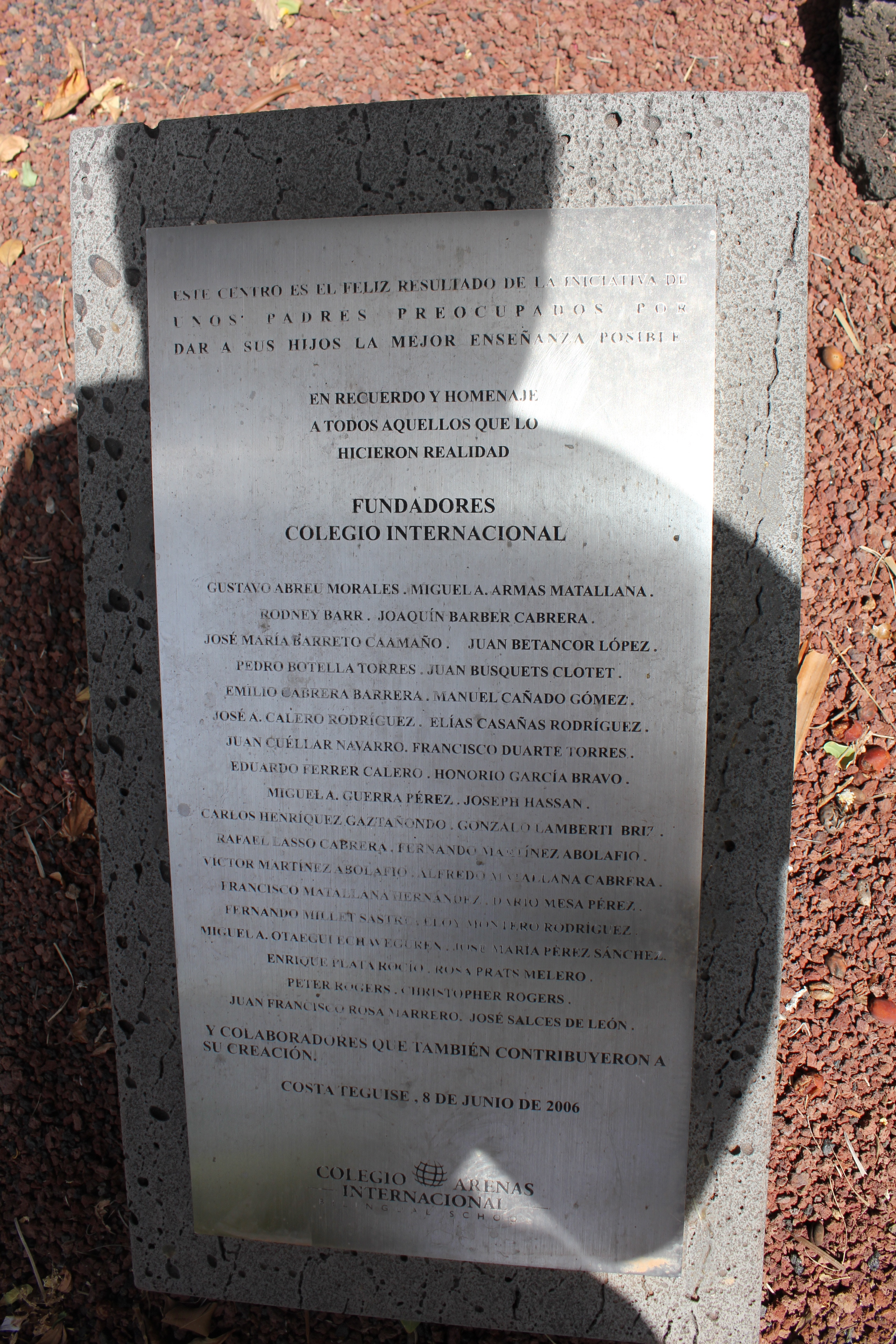
Commemorative plaque with the names of the founders of the Colegio Internacional de Lanzarote in Costa Teguise

Costa Teguise has one primary (CEIP Costa Teguise) and one secondary school (Instituto), as well as a private school. (Colegio Arenas Internacional).

The schools teach a wide variety of subjects including languages, such as English, Spanish, German, French and Chinese.
