= Teguise (village) =

- Town
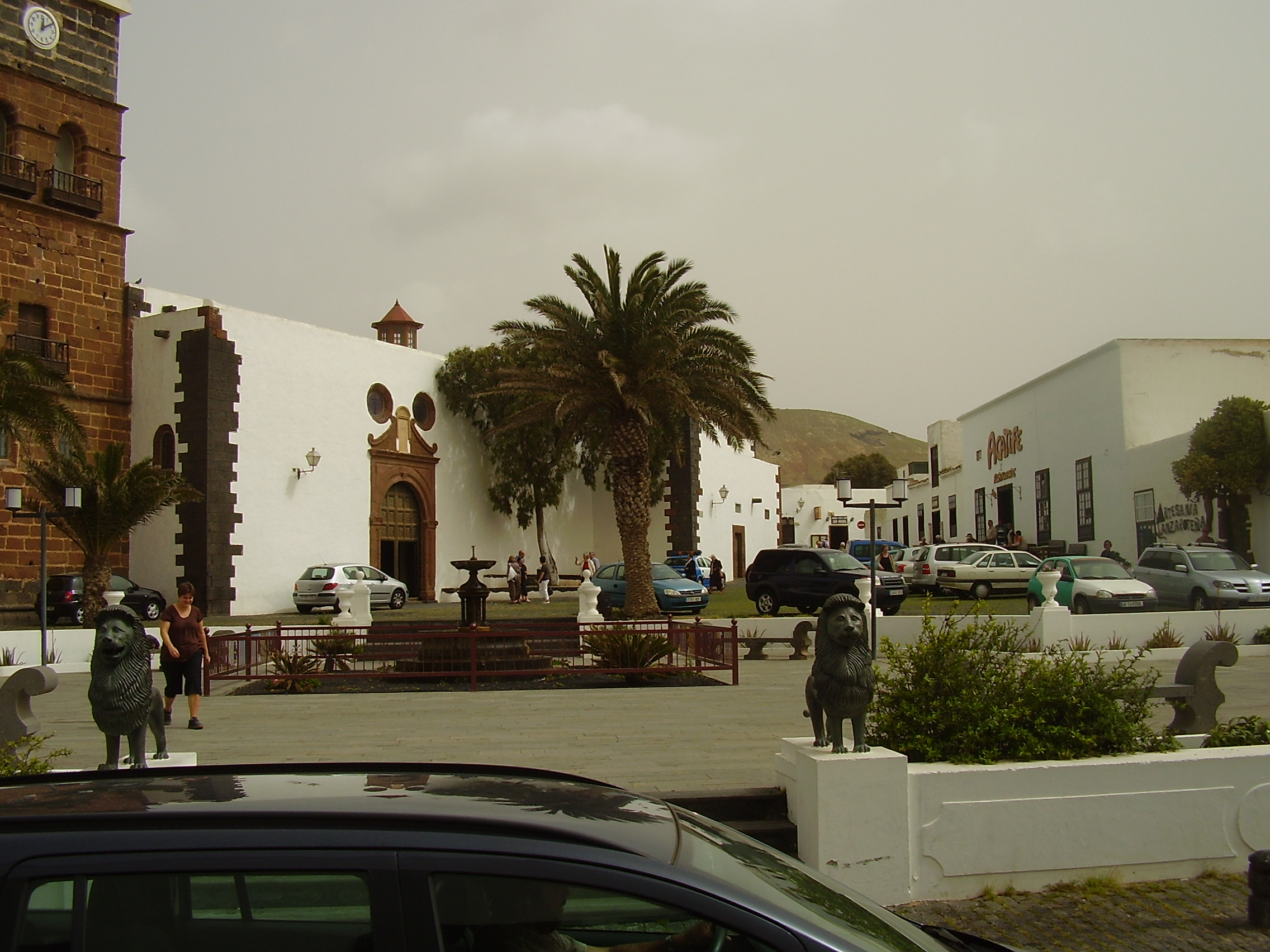
- Plaza Mayor

- Location in the Canary Islands Teguise (Canary Islands)
- Coordinates: 29°3′36″N 13°33′37″W
- Country: Spain
- Autonomous Community: Canary Islands
- Province: Las Palmas
- Island: Lanzarote
- Municipality: Teguise

Population (1 January 2018)
  - Total: 1,776
- Time zone: UTC+00:00 (WET)
  - Summer (DST): UTC+01:00 (WEST)
- Postal code: 35530
- Area code: +34 (Spain) + 928 (Las Palmas)

Teguise (pronounced [teˈɣise]), also known in Spanish as La Villa de Teguise, is a village in the municipality of Teguise in the north-central part of the island of Lanzarote in Las Palmas province in the Canary Islands. The town's population is 1,776 as of 1 January 2018.

The town is the capital of the municipality of Teguise.

A market is held in the town on Sunday mornings, and has become a popular tourist attraction.

== History ==
The town was founded in 1414. Teguise served as the capital of the Kingdom of the Canary Islands from 1425 to 1448 and as capital of the island until the capital moved to Arrecife in 1852.

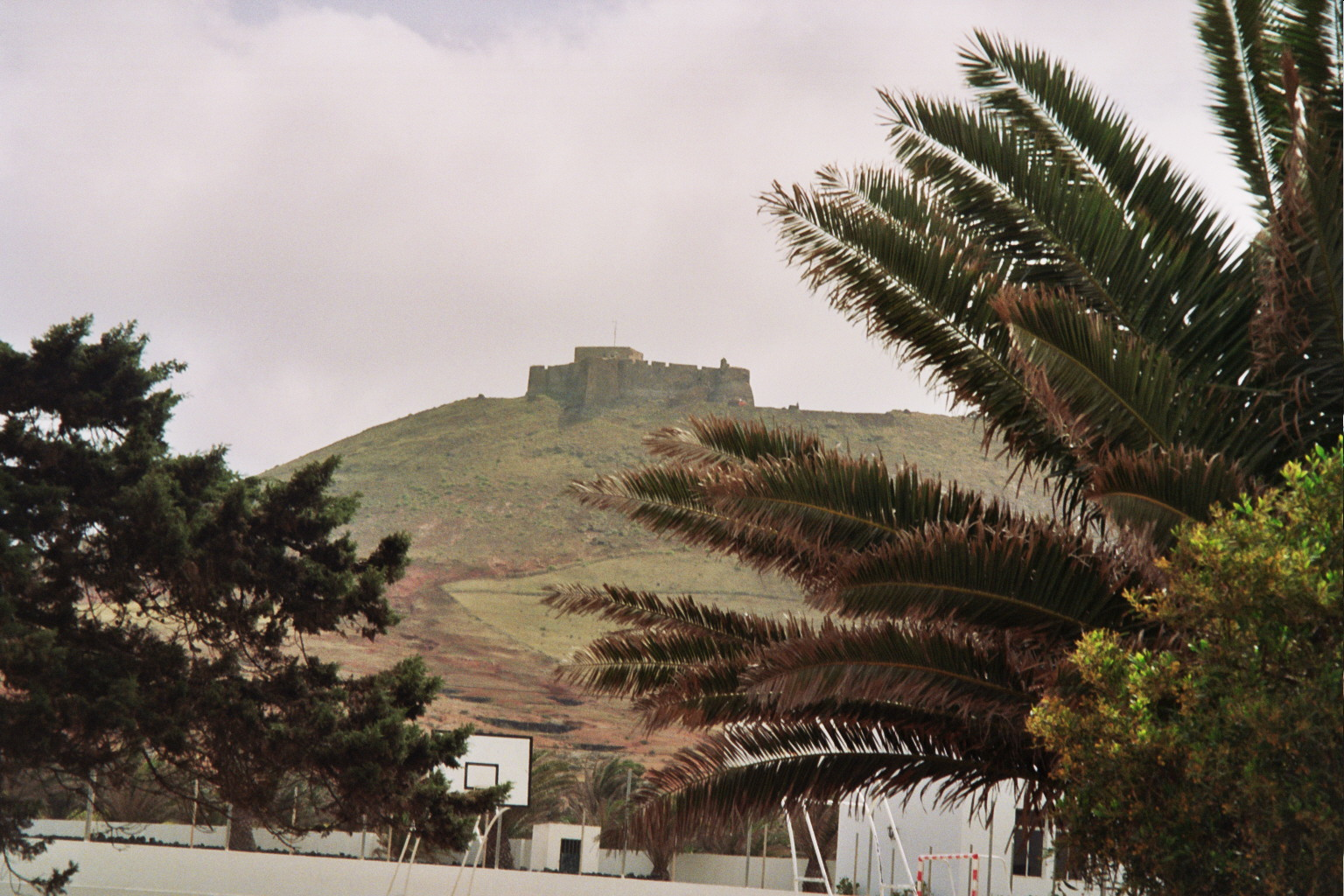
Santa Bárbara Castle

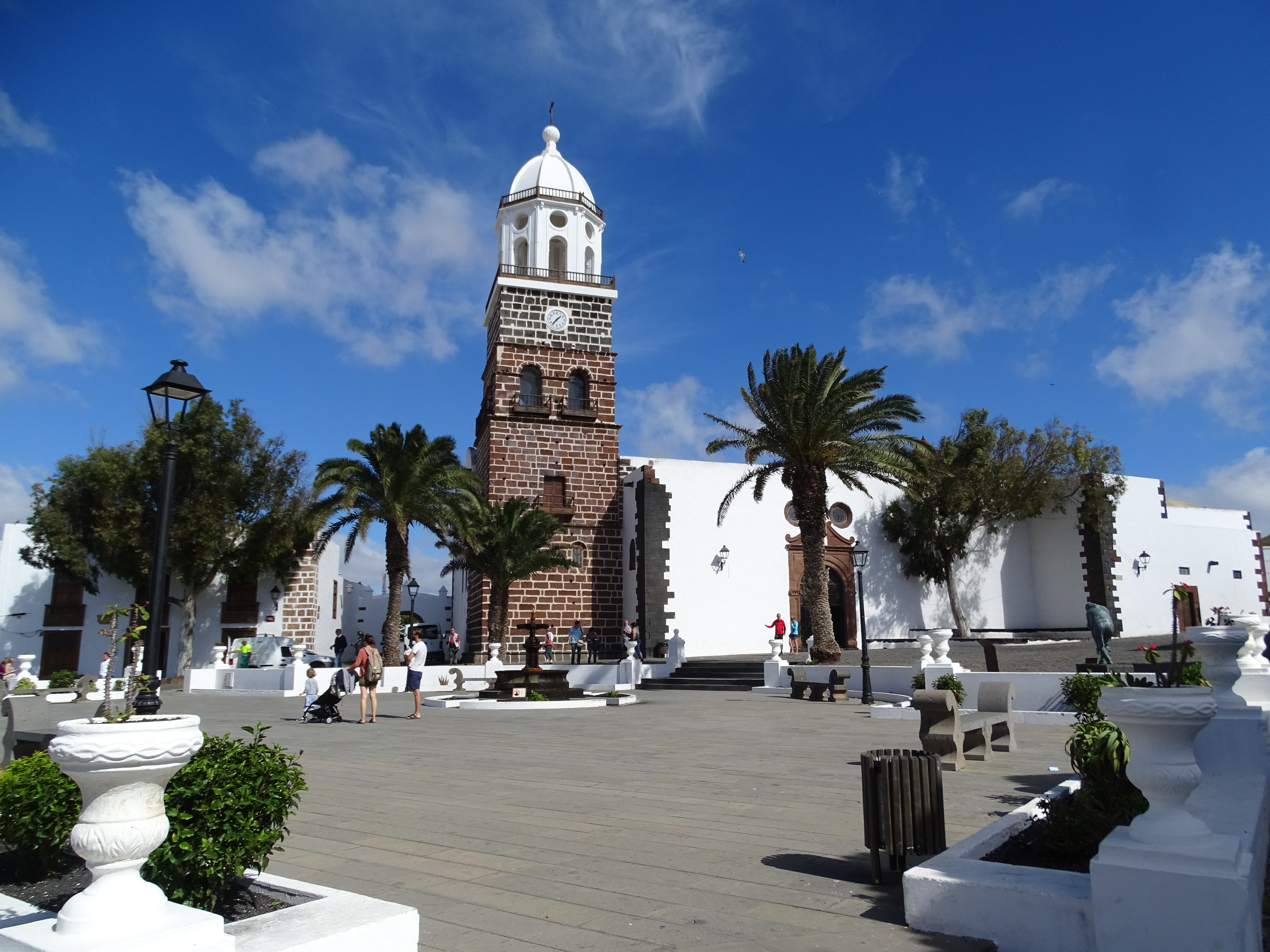
Church Nuestra Señora de Guadalupe
