= Teguise (municipality) =

- Municipality
- Flag Coat of arms

- Municipal location in Lanzarote

- Location in Lanzarote Location in the province of Las Palmas Location in the Canary Islands Location in Spain
- Coordinates: 29°3′N 13°34′W
- Country: Spain
- Autonomous community: Canary Islands
- Province: Las Palmas

Government
  - Mayor: Olivia Duque (CC)

Area
  - Total: 263.98 km^{2} (101.92 sq mi)
- Elevation: 360 m (1,180 ft)

Population (2025-01-01)
  - Total: 24,027
  - Density: 91.018/km^{2} (235.74/sq mi)
- Time zone: UTC±0 (WET)
  - Summer (DST): UTC+1 (WEST)
- Website: Official website

Teguise (pronounced [teˈɣise]) is a municipality in the central part of the island of Lanzarote in the Las Palmas province in the Canary Islands. The population is 22,342 (as of 1 January 2019), and the area is 263.98 km^{2}. It is located north of Arrecife and south of Haría. The seat of the municipality is the town of Teguise. The municipality also comprises a number of neighbouring islands including Graciosa (with 733 inhabitants in 2019), Alegranza, Roque del Este, Roque del Oeste and Montaña Clara.

The artist and architect César Manrique was born in the area. The insect of the island is the cochineal from which carmine, a dye, is extracted.

== Historical population ==
Historical population
Year	Pop.	±%
2000	12,184	—
2001	12,905	+5.9%
2002	13,714	+6.3%
2003	14,214	+3.6%
2004	14,477	+1.9%
2005	15,824	+9.3%
2006	16,616	+5.0%
2007	17,688	+6.5%
2008	18,798	+6.3%
2009	19,418	+3.3%
2010	20,105	+3.5%
2011	20,788	+3.4%
2012	21,096	+1.5%
2013	21,152	+0.3%
2014	21,101	−0.2%
2015	21,454	+1.7%
2016	21,724	+1.3%
2017	21,896	+0.8%
2018	22,122	+1.0%
Source: INE

== Settlements ==
- Las Cabreras
- Caleta de Sebo (Note: on the island of La Graciosa)
- Casas de Pedro Barba
- Caleta de Famara
- Las Caletas
- Costa Teguise
- Guatiza
- Las Laderas
- El Mojón
- Mozaga
- Muñique
- Nazaret
- Sóo
- Tahiche
- Tao
- Teguise
- Teseguite
- Tiagua
- Los Valles
- Los Ancones
- Caleta de Caballo
- Los Cocoteros
- Charco del Palo
- Tomarén

== Sites of interest ==
- Jardín de Cactus, in Guatiza
- Wind sculpture
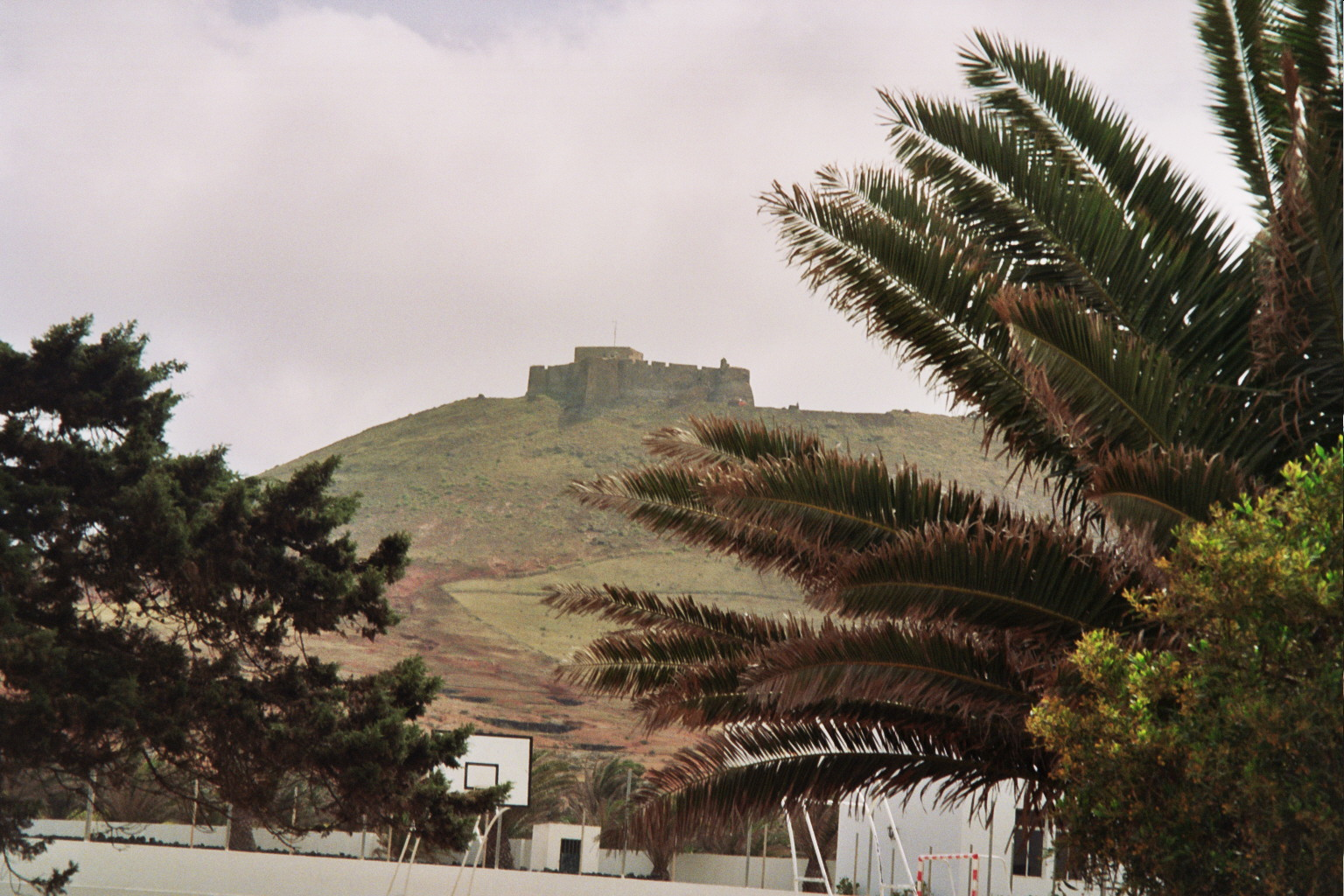
Santa Bárbara Castle

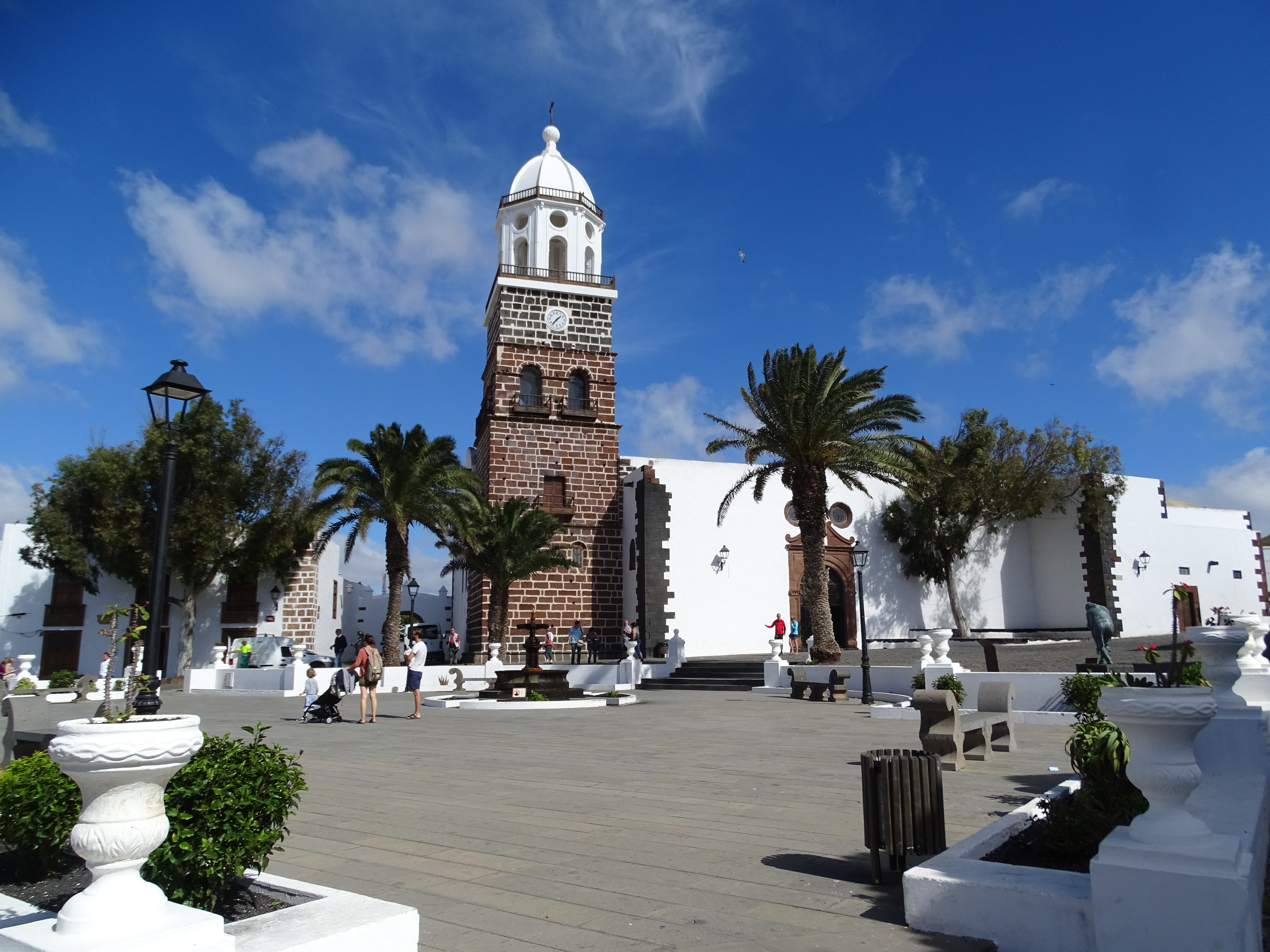
Teguise Church, bell tower

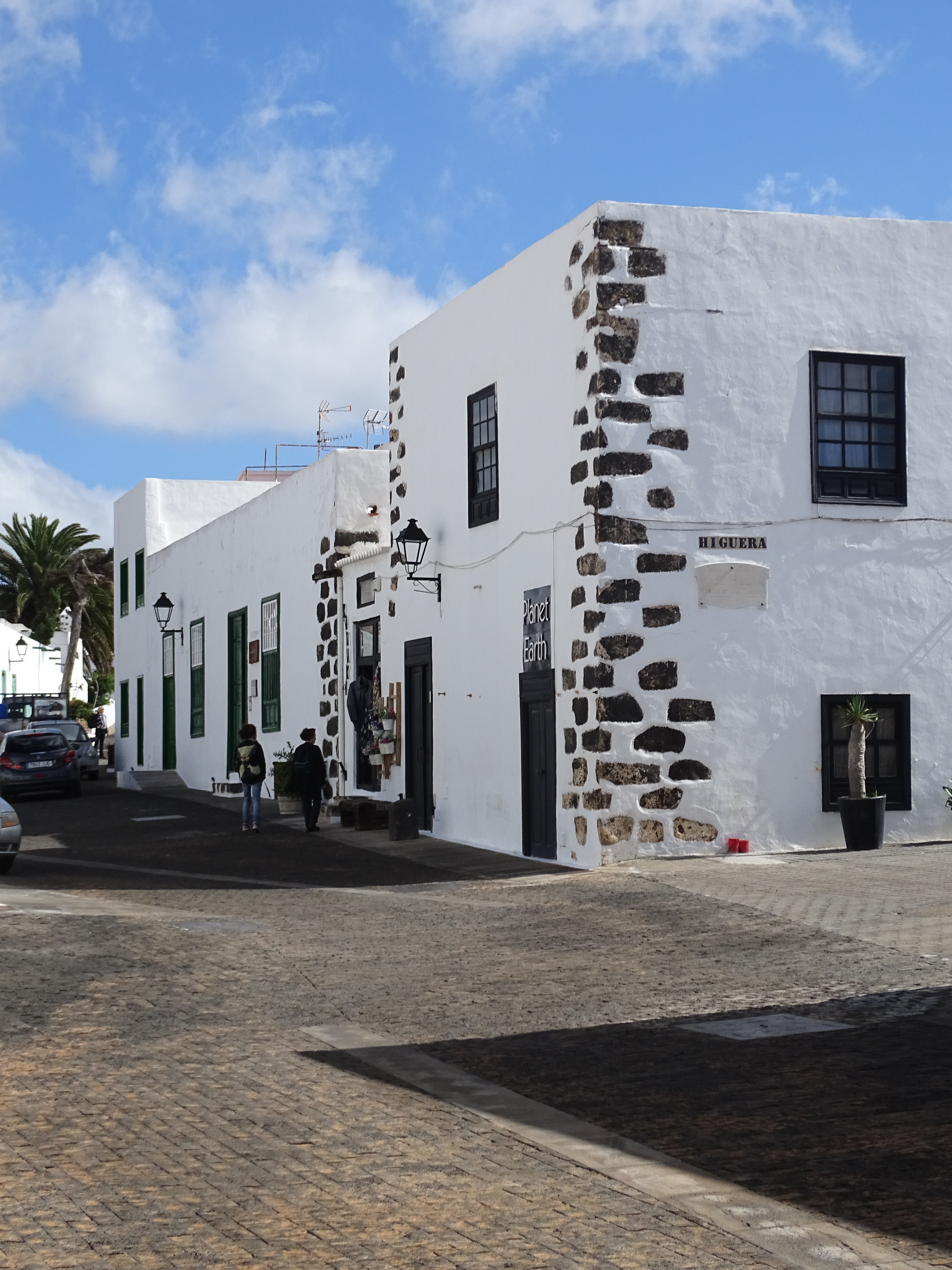
Typical architecture in Teguise

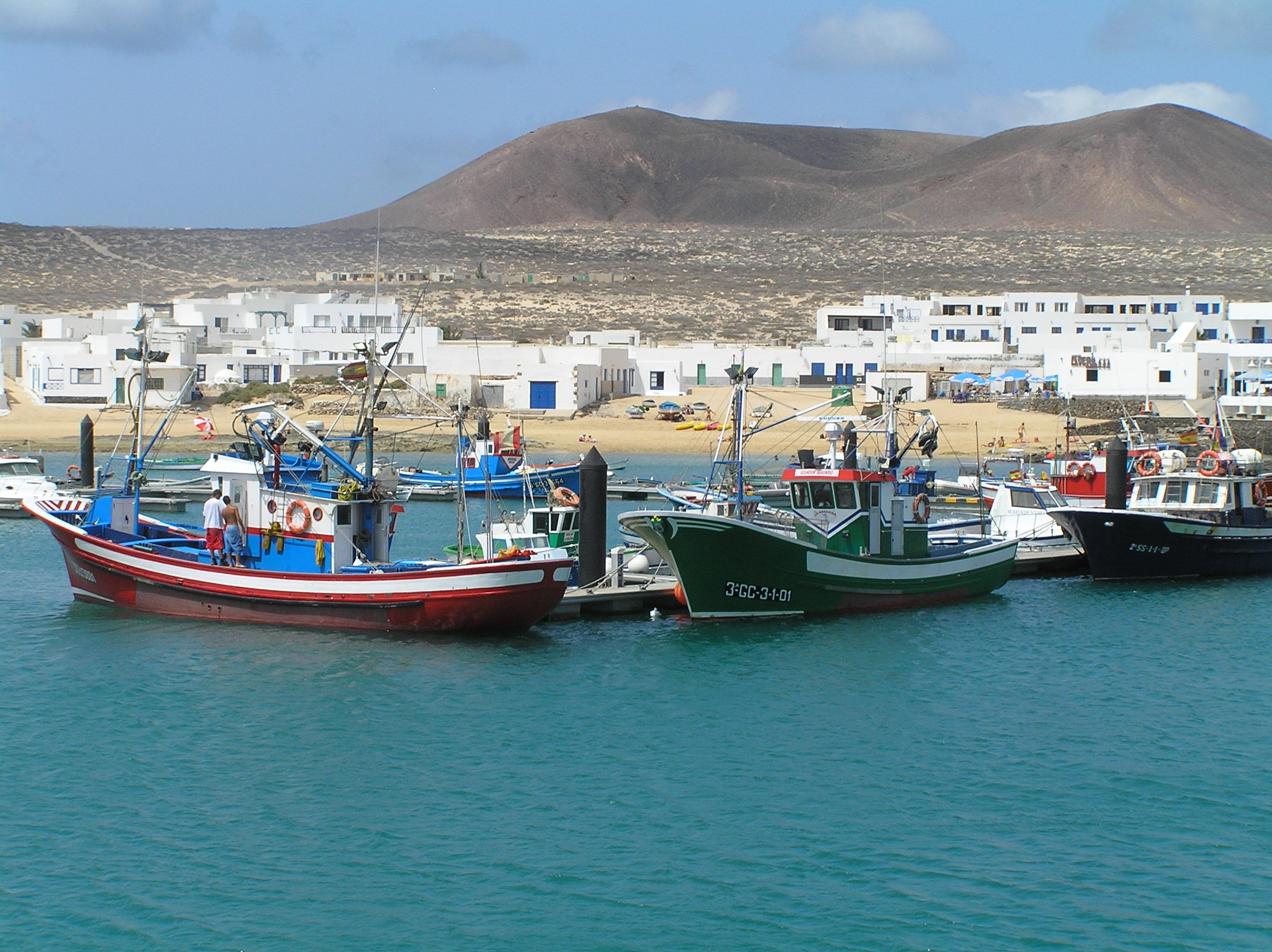
Isla de la Graciosa (la Graciosa Island)

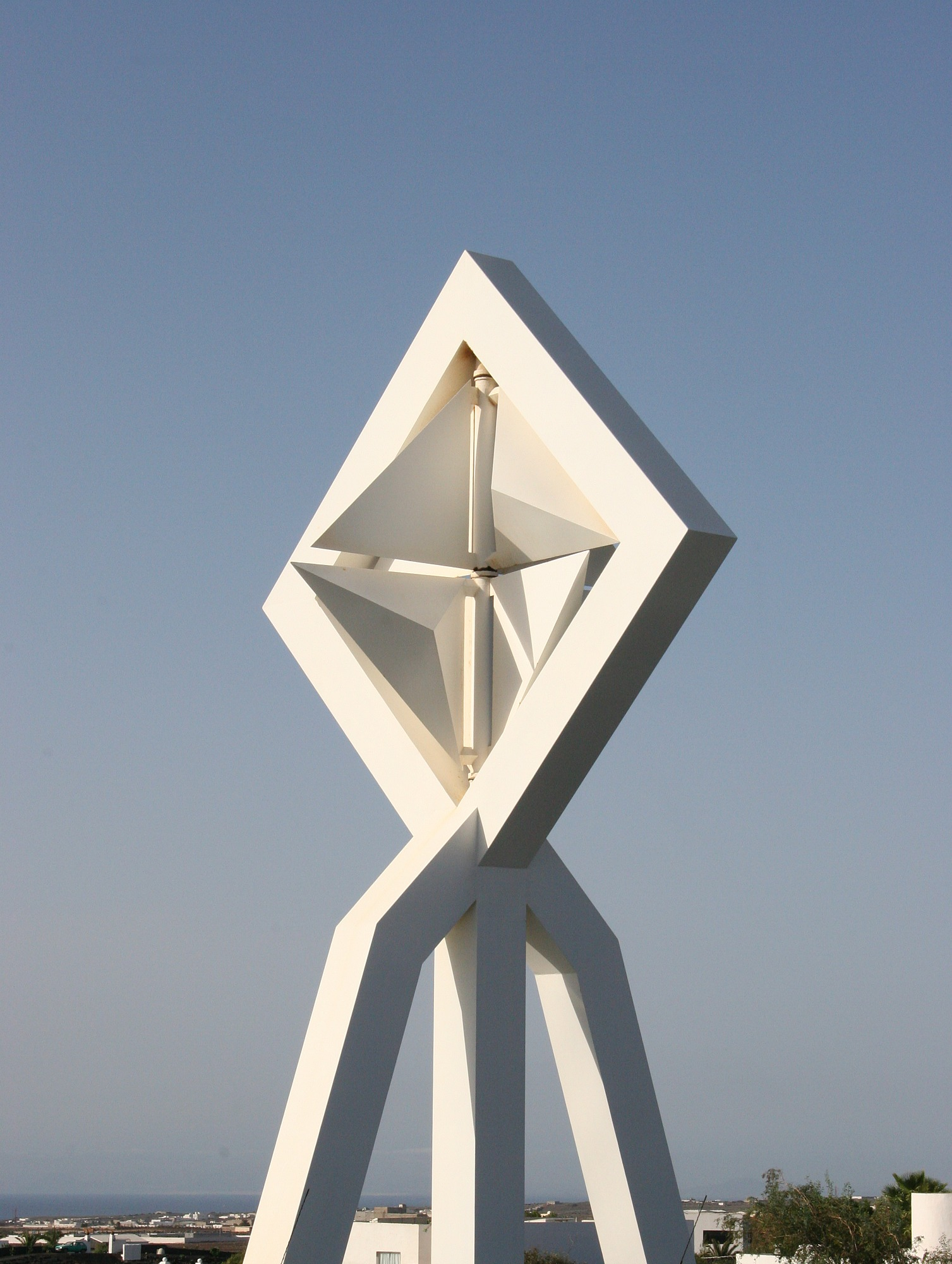
Wind sculpture by César Manrique, Taro de Tahíche

== See also ==
- List of municipalities in Las Palmas
