= Santa Bárbara Castle (Teguise) =

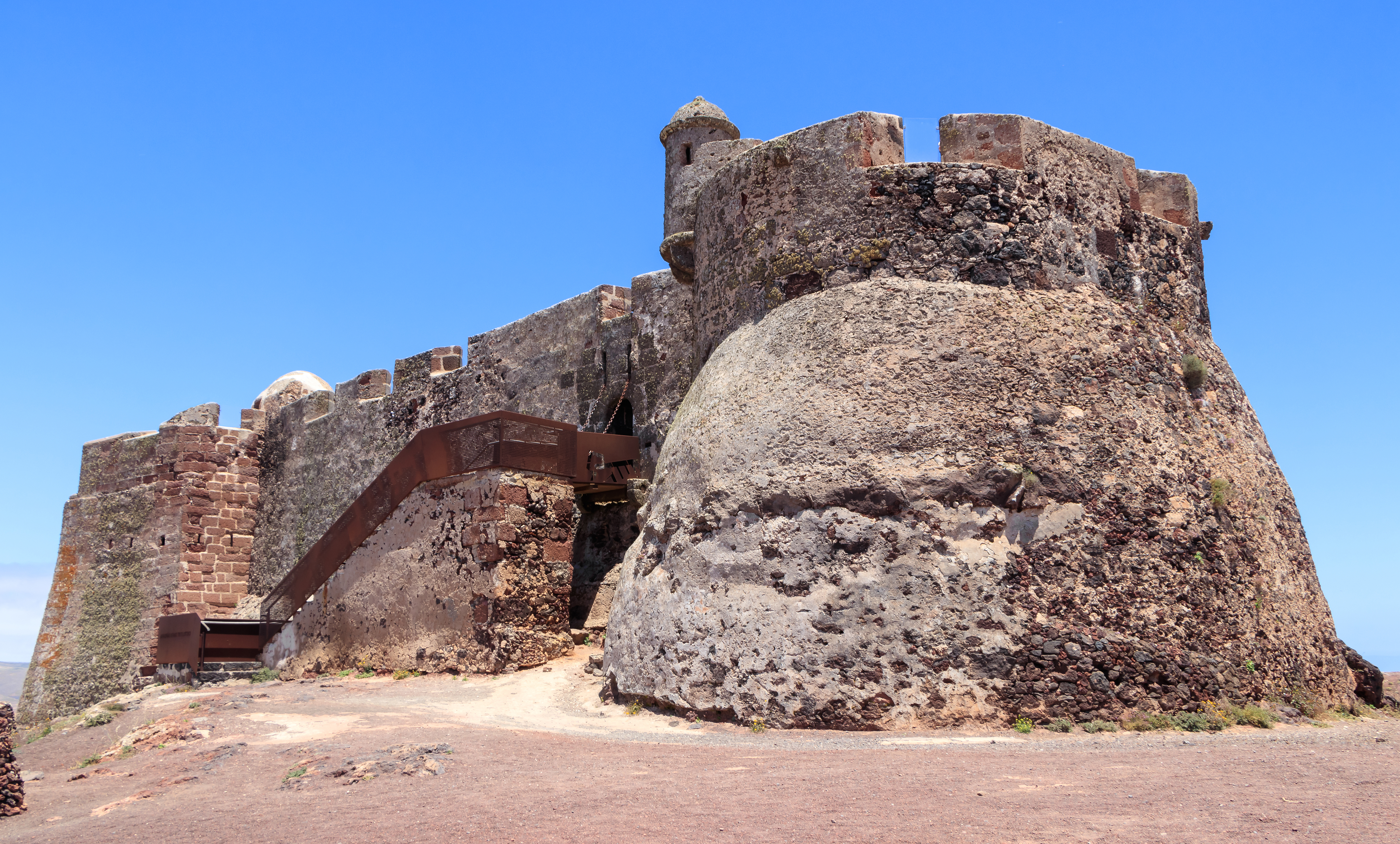
- The fortress

General information
- Town or city: Teguise
- Country: Spain (Lanzarote, Canary Islands)
- Coordinates: 29°03′29″N 13°33′00″W

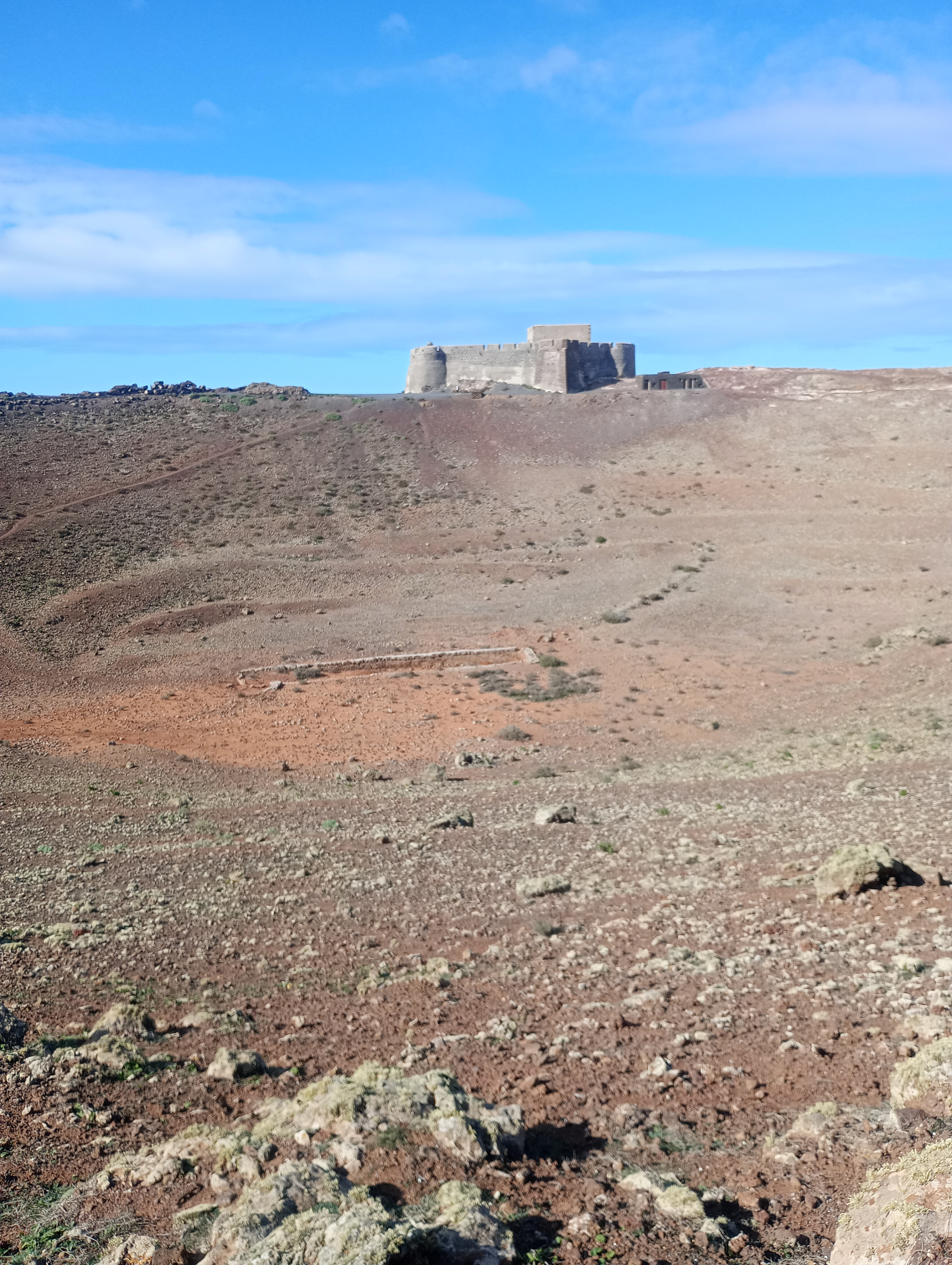
Crater of Guanapay and the fortress

Santa Bárbara Castle (officially Castillo de Santa Bárbara y San Hermenegildo) is a fortress located about 1 kilometer from the town of Teguise on Lanzarote, one of the Canary Islands. It sits atop the Guanapay volcano, on the edge of its crater. The fortress is open to the public and houses the Piracy Museum (Museo de la Piratería).

== History ==
At the site of the fortress, a simple watchtower was built in the 15th century to guard the coast. The tower was commissioned by Sancho de Herrera on the orders of Lancelotto Malocello. In the 16th century, Leonardo Torriani had the tower converted into a fortress. The fortress was intended to serve as a safe refuge for the inhabitants of Teguise (then the island’s capital) during enemy raids, especially pirate attacks. The construction was completed in 1576, and after a Berber attack in 1586, the fortress was reconstructed.

The fortress lost its significance in the 17th century when a massive fortification was built in the port of Arrecife. At that time, all artillery weapons were removed from the fortress. By the 19th century, pirate attacks had ceased, rendering the fortress completely obsolete. In 1899, a military pigeon loft was established there, and in 1913, the fortress was handed over to the municipality of Teguise.

In 1993, the fortress was declared a cultural heritage site. Between 1991 and 2011, it housed an ethnographic museum of Canarian immigrants, which was later replaced by the Piracy Museum.
