= Órzola =

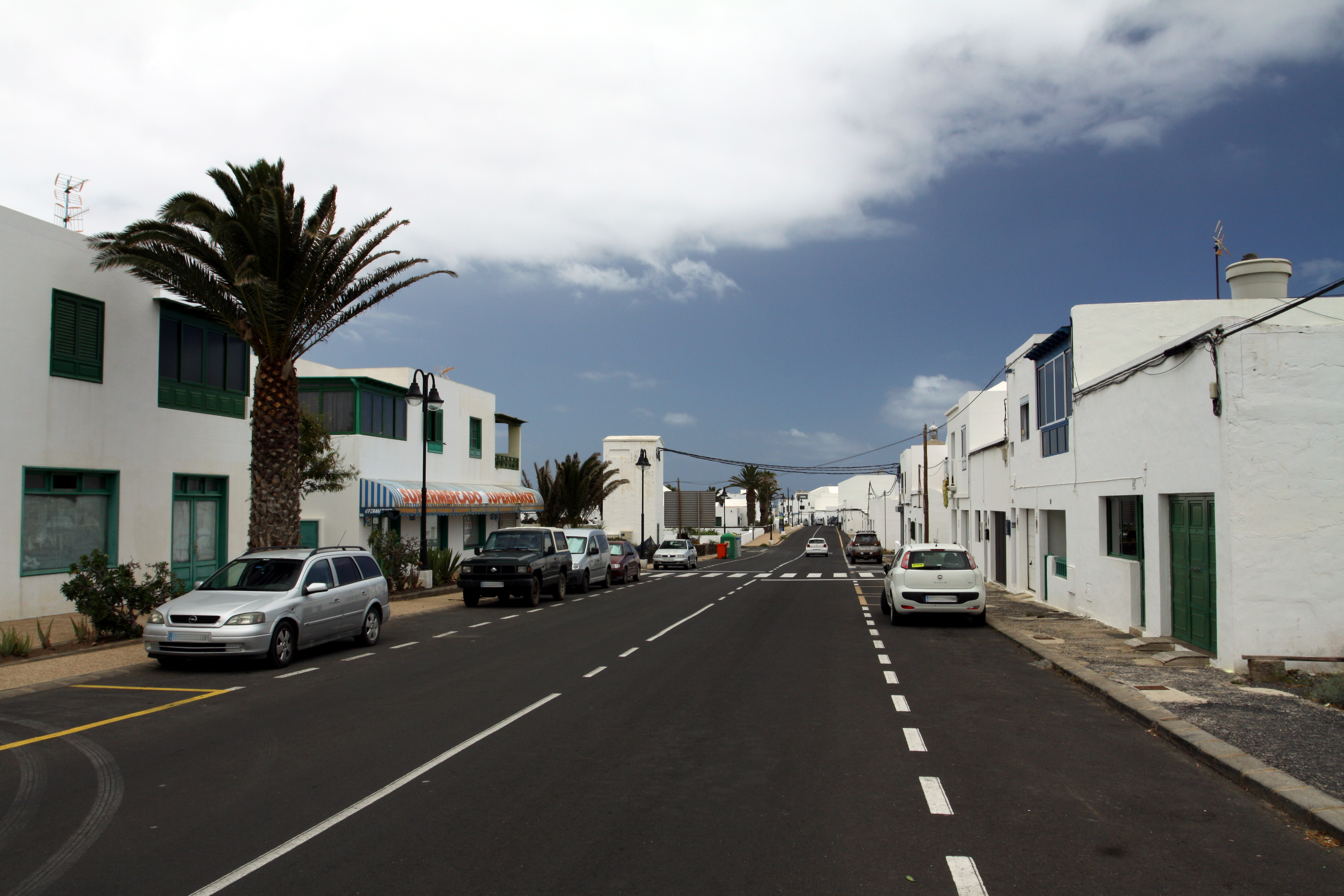
- Main street of Órzola

- Location within Lanzarote
- Coordinates: 29°13′19″N 13°27′09″W
- Country: Spain
- Autonomous Community: Canary Islands
- Province: Las Palmas
- Island: Lanzarote
- Municipality: Haría

Population (2021)
  - Total: 352
- Time zone: UTC±00:00 (WET)
  - Summer (DST): UTC+01:00 (WEST)
- Postcode: 35541

Órzola is a village in the municipality of Haría on the island of Lanzarote in the Canary Islands. It is the northernmost settlement of the island. As of 2021, it has a population of 352 inhabitants.

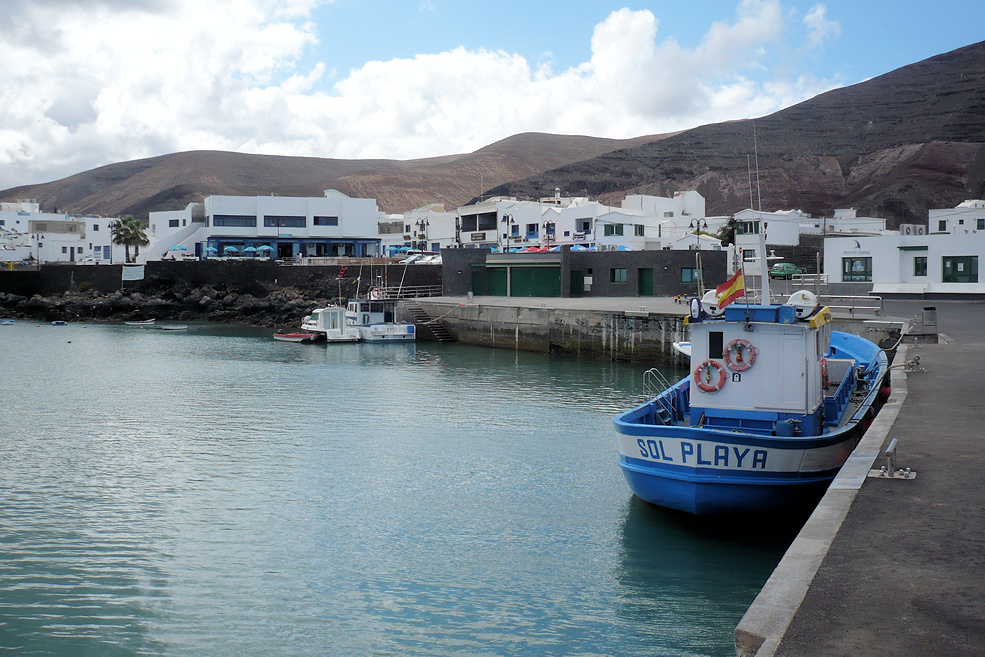
Port of Órzola

The port of Órzola is the departure point for the ferries to the island of La Graciosa.
