= Caleta de Sebo =

- Town
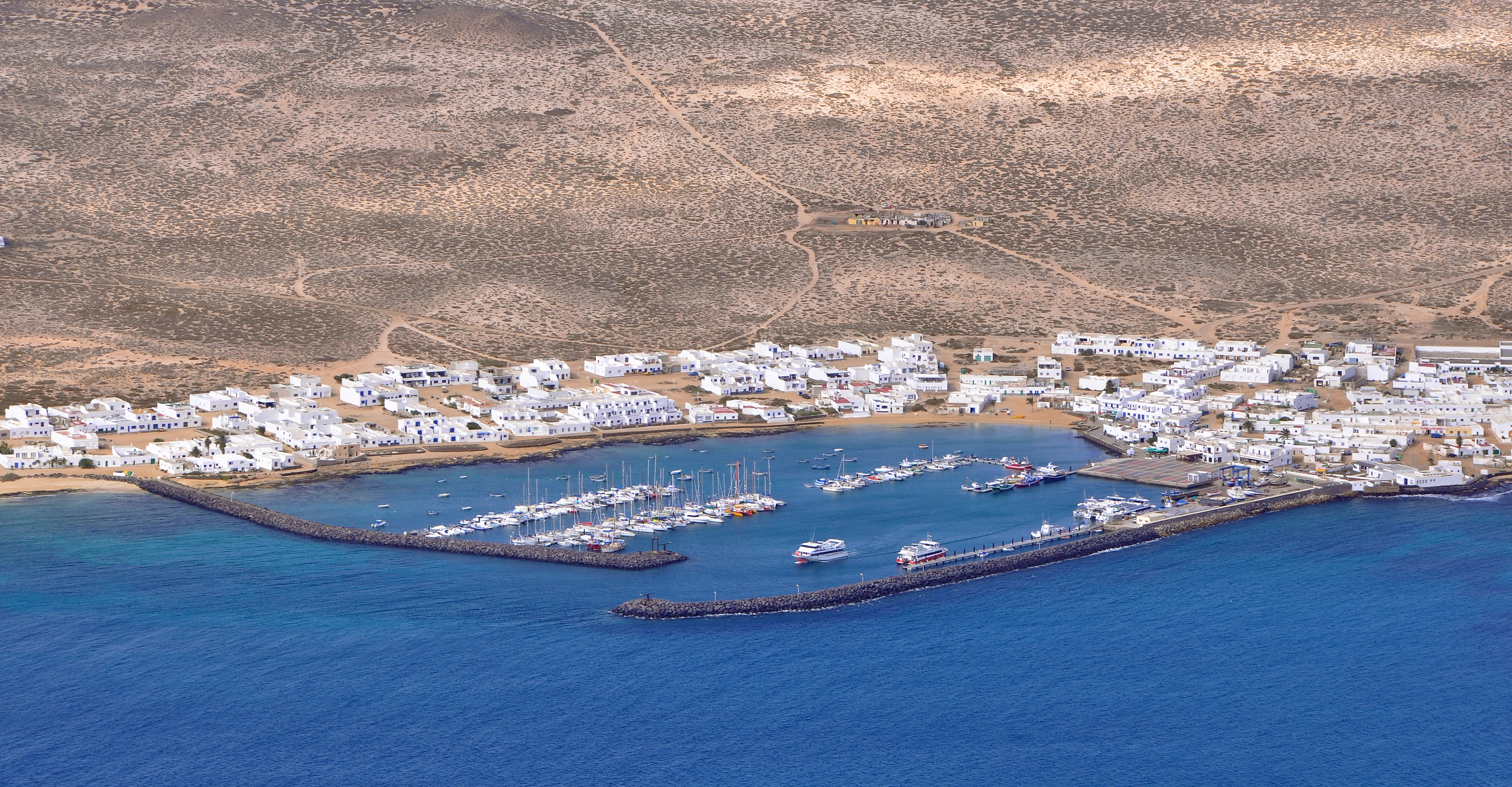

- Location within Lanzarote Location within Canary Islands
- Coordinates: 29°13′51″N 13°30′11″W
- Country: Spain
- Autonomous Community: Canary Islands
- Province: Las Palmas
- Island: La Graciosa
- Municipality: Teguise

Population (1 January 2018)
  - Total: 730
- Time zone: UTC+00:00 (WET)
  - Summer (DST): UTC+01:00 (WEST)
- Postcode: 35540

Caleta de Sebo (or Caleta del Sebo) is the main settlement and capital community of La Graciosa (Canary Islands, Spain).

With a population of 730 (INE, 2018), Caleta de Sebo, together with the rest of the island of La Graciosa, is included in the municipality of Teguise on Lanzarote.

Tourism is the main industry along with fishing. Every year, tourists visit the island for its temperate climate and its sandy volcanic coasts. The island has a school, a lyceum, a post office, supermarkets, a port, beaches, the only bank on the island (a Bankia bank branch reported as being in danger of closing in September 2013) and a square (plaza) where bicycles can be hired.

The town is the only port of entry to the island, offering regular ferry services to Órzola, Lanzarote.

== Demographics ==
Population of Caleta de Sebo
Year	2000	2001	2002	2003	2004	2005	2006	2007	2008	2009	2010	2011	2012	2013	2014	2015	2016	2017	2018
Pop.	626	615	624	617	628	635	656	638	646	642	657	653	663	679	696	718	743	748	730
±%	—	−1.8%	+1.5%	−1.1%	+1.8%	+1.1%	+3.3%	−2.7%	+1.3%	−0.6%	+2.3%	−0.6%	+1.5%	+2.4%	+2.5%	+3.2%	+3.5%	+0.7%	−2.4%
Source: INE
