= Graciosa, Canary Islands =

Canary Island in the Chinijo Archipelago

La Graciosa
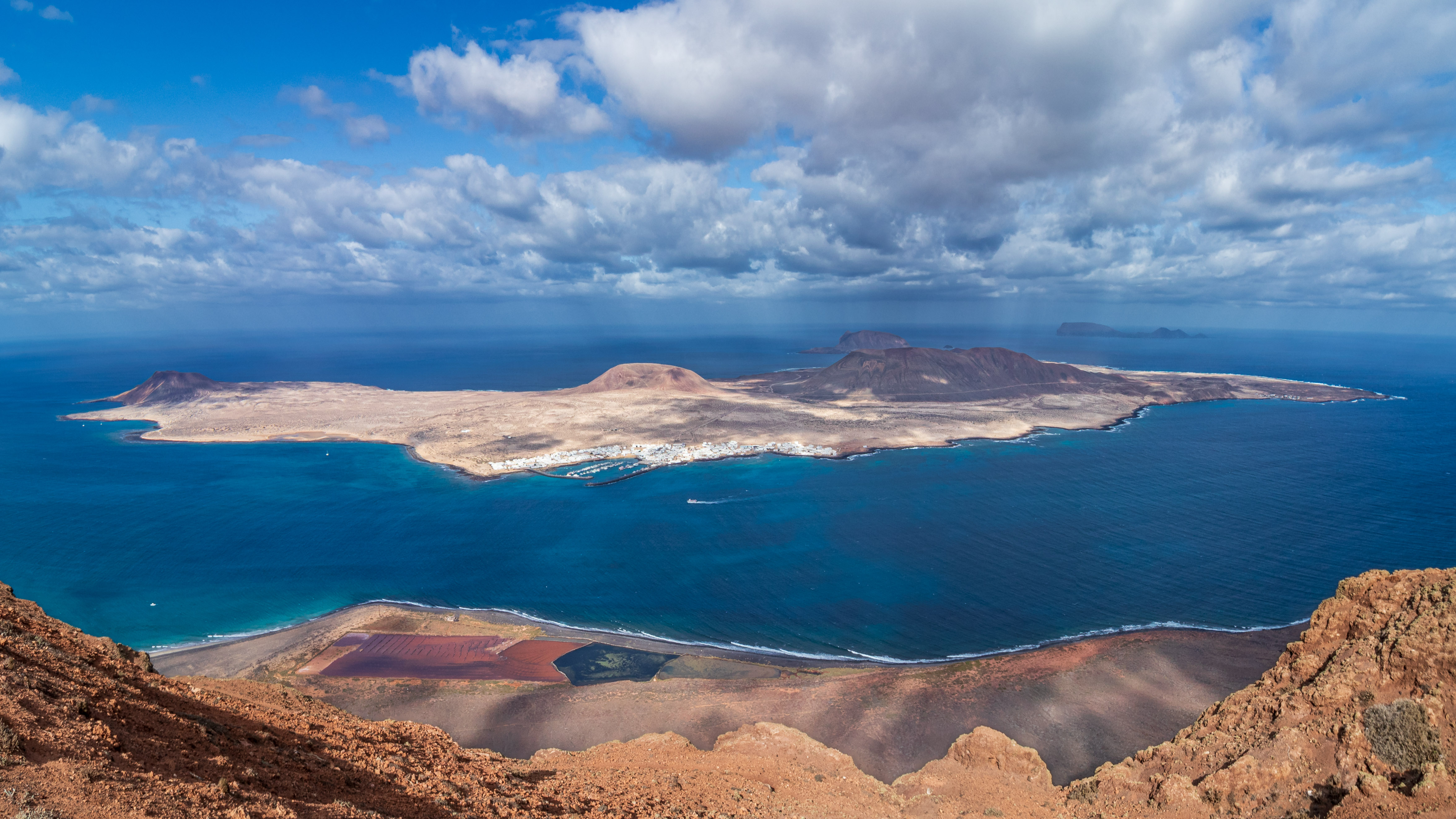
- La Graciosa from Mirador Del Río

- Location with respect to Lanzarote Graciosa, Canary Islands (Province of Las Palmas) Graciosa, Canary Islands (Canary Islands) Graciosa, Canary Islands (Spain, Canary Islands)

Geography
- Location: Atlantic Ocean
- Coordinates: 29.250°N 13.508°W
- Archipelago: Chinijo Archipelago, Canary Islands
- Area: 29.05 km^{2} (11.22 sq mi)
- Coastline: 30.395 km (18.8866 mi)
- Highest elevation: 266 m (873 ft)
- Highest point: Agujas Grandes

Administration
- Spain
- Autonomous Community: Canary Islands
- Province: Las Palmas
- Municipality: Teguise
- Largest settlement: Caleta de Sebo (pop. 730)

Demographics
- Population: 719 (2025)
- Pop. density: 25.27/km^{2} (65.45/sq mi)
- Languages: Spanish, specifically Canarian Spanish

Additional information
- Time zone: WET (UTC±00:00)
  - Summer (DST): WEST (UTC+01:00)

Graciosa Island or commonly La Graciosa (Spanish: [la ɣɾaˈθjosa]; locally [la ɣɾaˈsjosa] Spanish for "the graceful") is a volcanic island in the Canary Islands of Spain, located two kilometres (one nautical mile) north of Lanzarote across the Strait of El Río. As the rest of the Canary Islands, it was formed by the Canary hotspot. The island is part of the Chinijo Archipelago and the Chinijo Archipelago Natural Park (Parque Natural del Archipiélago Chinijo). It is administered by the municipality of Teguise in the neighboring island of Lanzarote. In 2018 La Graciosa was officially declared the eighth Canary Island by the Spanish Senate, with few real effects. Before then, the island had the status of an islet. It is administratively dependent on the island of Lanzarote.

The only two settlements on the island are Caleta de Sebo in the southeastern part of the island and summer-residence Casas de Pedro Barba; the rest of the island is owned by the Government of Spain and is administered by the National Parks Autonomous Agency.

The population is about 700. Tourism is the main industry along with fishing. The island has a tempered climate and sandy volcanic coasts. The island has a school, lyceum, post office, supermarkets, medical center, pharmacy, and a bank, port, beaches, bar-restaurants and a square. Because of the transportation cost, everyday shopping is more expensive than in the other islands.

Streets and roads on La Graciosa are unpaved sand. Motor vehicles are strictly limited to a small number of licensed vehicles for special purposes. Access to the island is by a 25-minute ferry crossing from Órzola on Lanzarote to the harbour in the village. There was a campsite on the island situated on Playa del Salado at the western edge of Caleta del Sebo which closed permanently during the COVID pandemic.

== Geographical features ==
The island is extremely arid and entirely made up of bushes and dry soil. Its length is 8 km (5 mi) and the width is 4 km (2 1/2 mi), with an area of 29 km^{2} (11 1/4 sq mi). There are no natural water sources on the island; desalinated water has been piped directly from neighbouring Lanzarote since 2001. Water supply is at risk when the pipe gets broken.

There are several isolated hills on the island, the tallest of which is Agujas Grandes, rising to 266 m (873 ft). The second-tallest is Agujas Chicas at 228 m (748 ft). In the south of the island stands Montaña Amarilla at 175 m (574 ft), which can be climbed by a path from its northern side. Playa de la Cocina is a well known beach in the southwestern part of the island.

The island has a hot desert climate (Köppen: BWh; Trewartha: BWal) with an annual precipitation of only 76.7 millimetres (3.02 in).

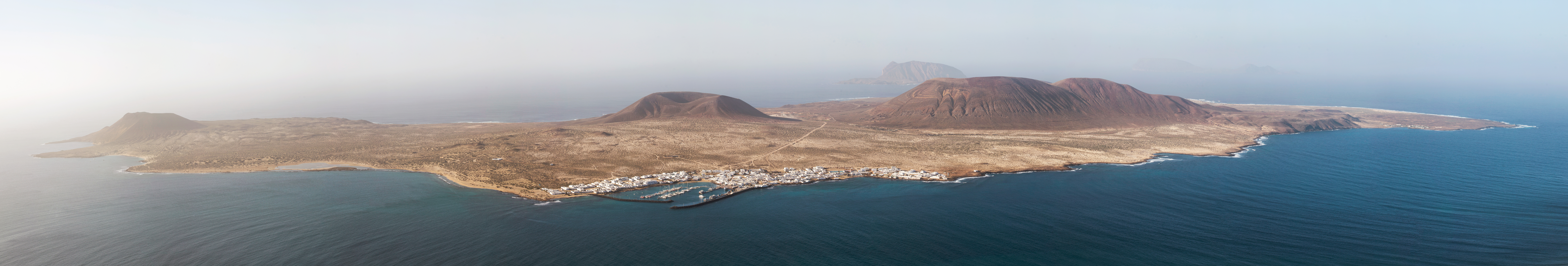
Panorama photo taken from Lanzarote showing La Graciosa

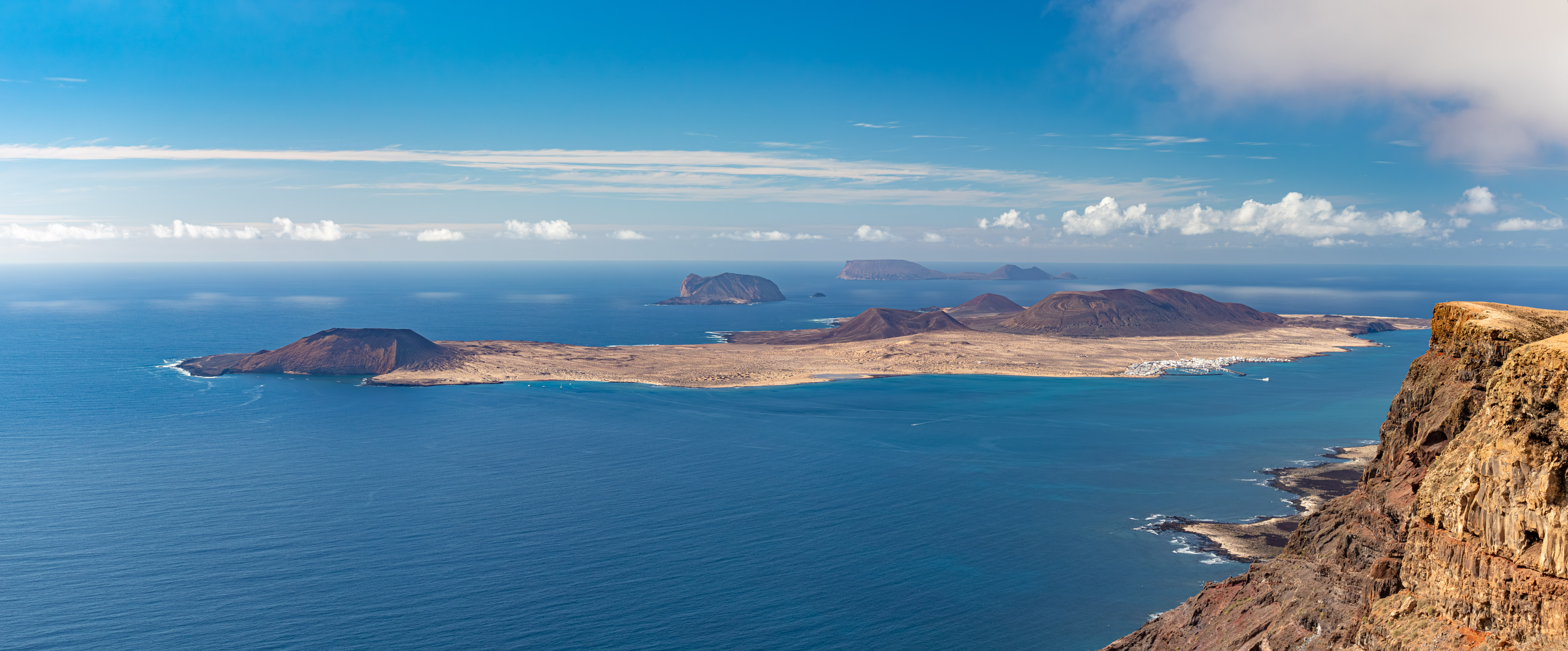
La Graciosa and other islands of Chinijo Archipelago from Lanzarote

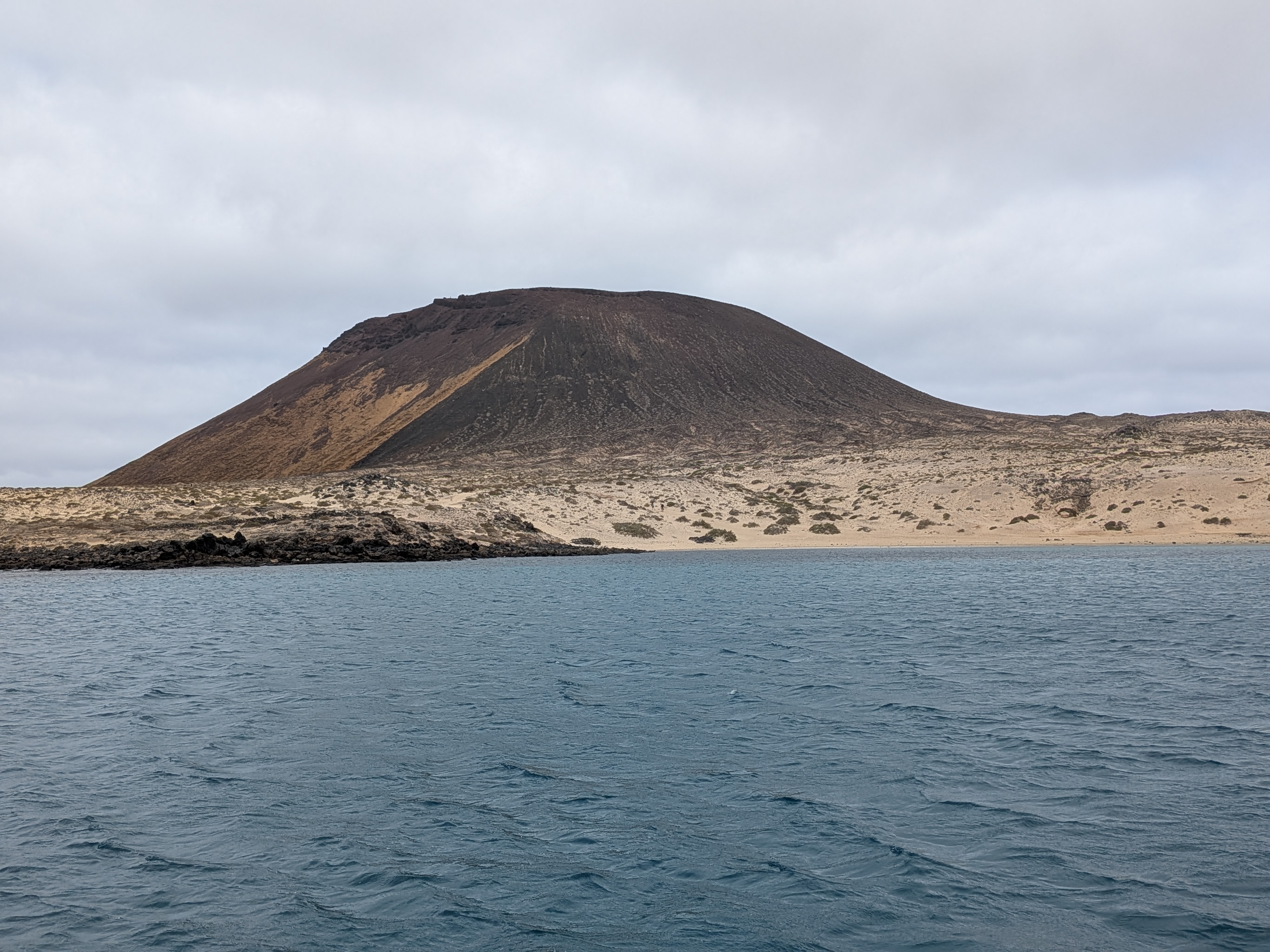
Montaña Amarilla as viewed from Baya Francesa at the southern end of La Graciosa

Climate data for La Graciosa WMO ID: 60045; Climate ID: C839X; coordinates 29°13′46″N 13°30′37″W; elevation: 19 m (62 ft); 1991–2020 normals, extremes 1990–present
Month	Jan	Feb	Mar	Apr	May	Jun	Jul	Aug	Sep	Oct	Nov	Dec	Year
Record high °C (°F)	29.7 (85.5)	29.3 (84.7)	33.1 (91.6)	31.8 (89.2)	36.0 (96.8)	30.5 (86.9)	29.9 (85.8)	31.8 (89.2)	32.1 (89.8)	37.8 (100.0)	33.7 (92.7)	30.0 (86.0)	37.8 (100.0)
Mean daily maximum °C (°F)	21.8 (71.2)	21.5 (70.7)	21.6 (70.9)	22.7 (72.9)	23.9 (75.0)	25.2 (77.4)	26.1 (79.0)	27.2 (81.0)	27.0 (80.6)	26.8 (80.2)	24.8 (76.6)	22.8 (73.0)	24.3 (75.7)
Daily mean °C (°F)	18.7 (65.7)	18.3 (64.9)	18.4 (65.1)	19.3 (66.7)	20.7 (69.3)	22.1 (71.8)	23.4 (74.1)	24.3 (75.7)	24.0 (75.2)	23.4 (74.1)	21.6 (70.9)	19.8 (67.6)	21.2 (70.2)
Mean daily minimum °C (°F)	15.6 (60.1)	15.1 (59.2)	15.2 (59.4)	15.9 (60.6)	17.5 (63.5)	19.0 (66.2)	20.6 (69.1)	21.5 (70.7)	20.9 (69.6)	20.0 (68.0)	18.5 (65.3)	16.8 (62.2)	18.0 (64.4)
Record low °C (°F)	11.4 (52.5)	9.5 (49.1)	9.9 (49.8)	10.9 (51.6)	13.4 (56.1)	15.4 (59.7)	17.2 (63.0)	18.7 (65.7)	17.5 (63.5)	15.3 (59.5)	12.6 (54.7)	12.4 (54.3)	9.5 (49.1)
Average precipitation mm (inches)	6.5 (0.26)	11.8 (0.46)	7.3 (0.29)	3.9 (0.15)	0.7 (0.03)	0.7 (0.03)	0.4 (0.02)	0.2 (0.01)	5.9 (0.23)	17.6 (0.69)	8.7 (0.34)	13.2 (0.52)	76.7 (3.02)
Average precipitation days (≥ 1.0 mm)	1.6	2.7	2.3	0.8	0.1	0.1	0.0	0.0	0.5	2.9	2.4	3.0	16.5
Average relative humidity (%)	60	65	67	67	68	68	72	73	72	71	67	65	68
Percentage possible sunshine	64	60	63	64	53	45	38	51	61	64	64	66	58
Source: State Meteorological Agency/AEMET OpenData

== See also ==
- Geology of the Canary Islands
