= Juvenilia (disambiguation) =

Juvenilia is a term applied to literary or artistic works produced by an author during his or her youth.

Juvenilia may also refer to:

- Juvenilia (EP), a 1995 EP by Liz Phair
- Juvenilia (album), an album by The Verlaines
- Juvenilia (play), a play by Wendy MacLeod
- Juvenilia (film), a 1943 Argentine film
- "Juvenilia" (Frasier), an episode of the TV series Frasier
- Juvenilia (Hunt poetry collection), a collection of poems written by James Henry Leigh Hunt
- Juvenilia (Chen poetry collection), a 2010 poetry collection by Ken Chen
