= Parque Marítimo del Mediterráneo =

Leisure complex in Ceuta, Spain

Coordinates: 35°53′23.33″N 5°18′32.92″W

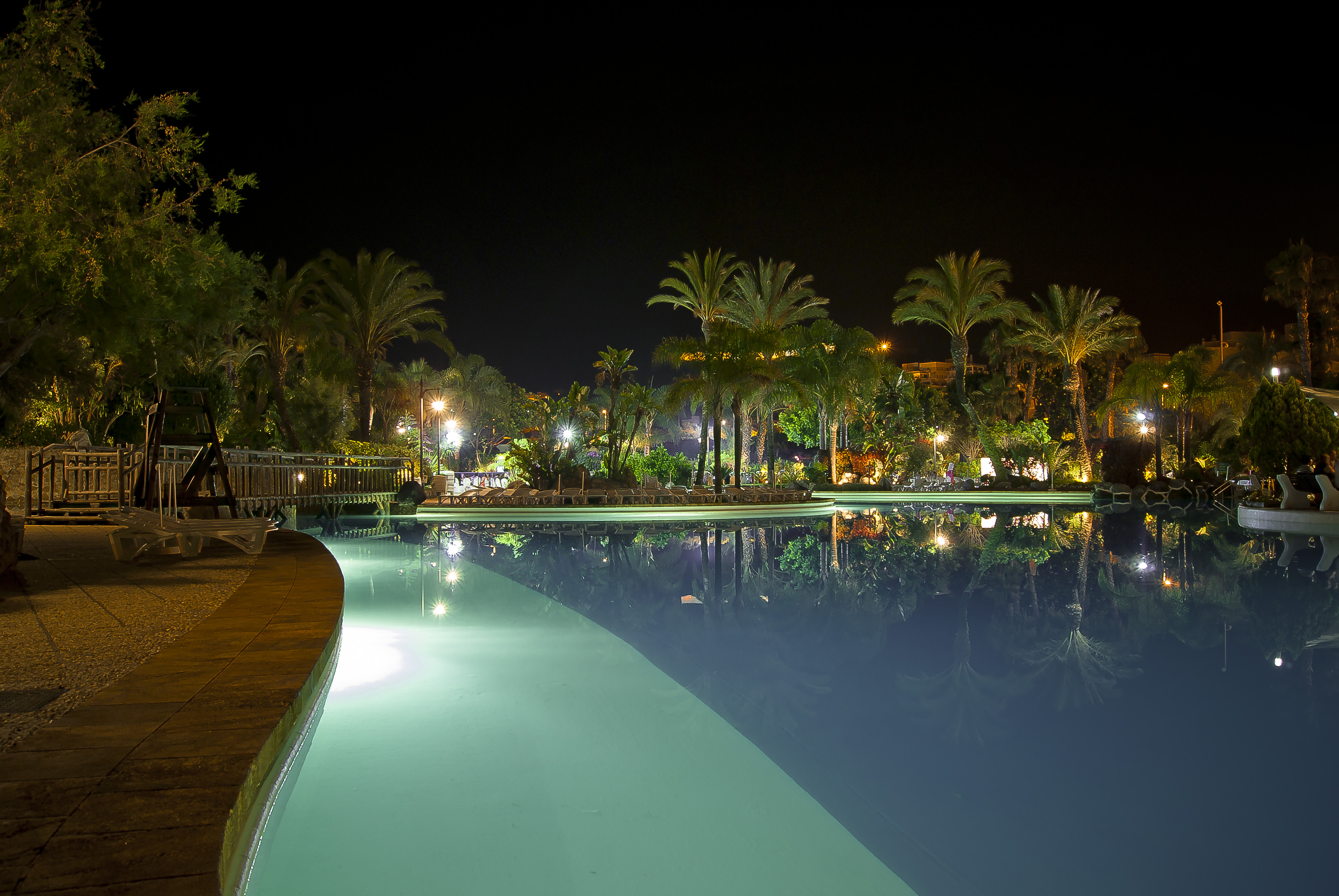
Parque Marítimo del Mediterráneo by night

The Parque Marítimo del Mediterráneo is a leisure complex covering 55,000 m^{2} located in the autonomous Spanish city of Ceuta, bordering northern Morocco. It consists of three artificial lakes of salt water, filtered directly from the sea. These are suitable for swimming during the summer months. The park also contains gardens, ornamental waterfalls, sunbathing areas, a stage for concerts and shows and various entertainment establishments such as bars, restaurants, pubs, a casino, and a nightclub, etc. It was designed by the versatile Lanzarote-born artist César Manrique and inaugurated in 1995, nearly three years after his death. It has similarities with Parque Marítimo César Manrique in Puerto de la Cruz, Tenerife, designed by the same architect two decades earlier. In the centre of the complex is a unique building, as it mimics the Royal Walls of Ceuta and the moat of San Felipe. This building houses the casino, a nightclub and a restaurant. The park also has a permanent exhibition about its creator, Manrique.
