= The Palace of Pleasure =

The Palace of Pleasure may refer to:

- The Palace of Pleasure (book), 1560s book by William Painter (author)
- The Palace of Pleasure (poem), 1801 English poem by Leigh Hunt
- The Palace of Pleasure (film), 1926 American silent film

== See also ==
- Pleasure Palace, 1980 American television film
- The Palace of Heavenly Pleasure, 2003 novel by Adam Williams
