= César Manrique =

Spanish painter

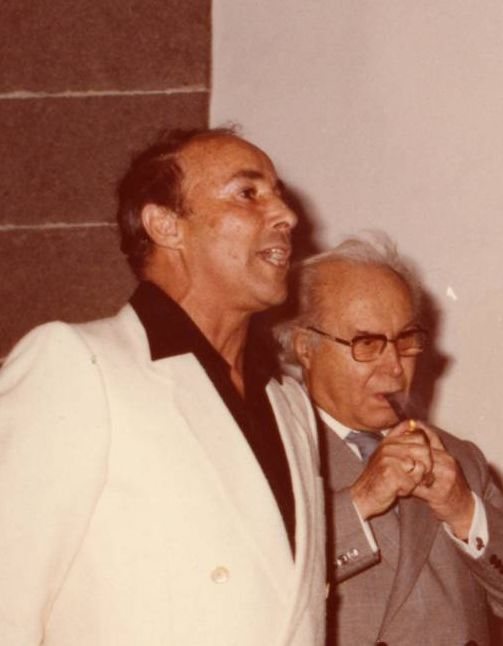
- Manrique (left) at a 1983 exposition.
- Born: César Manrique Cabrera; April 24, 1919; Arrecife, Lanzarote, Spain
- Died: September 25, 1992 (aged 73); Tahíche, Teguise
- Education: University of La Laguna; Academia de Bellas Artes de San Fernando
- Years active: 1939–1992
- Known for: Architecture; Sculpture; Painting; Interior design
- Movement: informalism, abstract art
- Partner: Josefa "Pepi" Gómez (1945-1963)

Signature
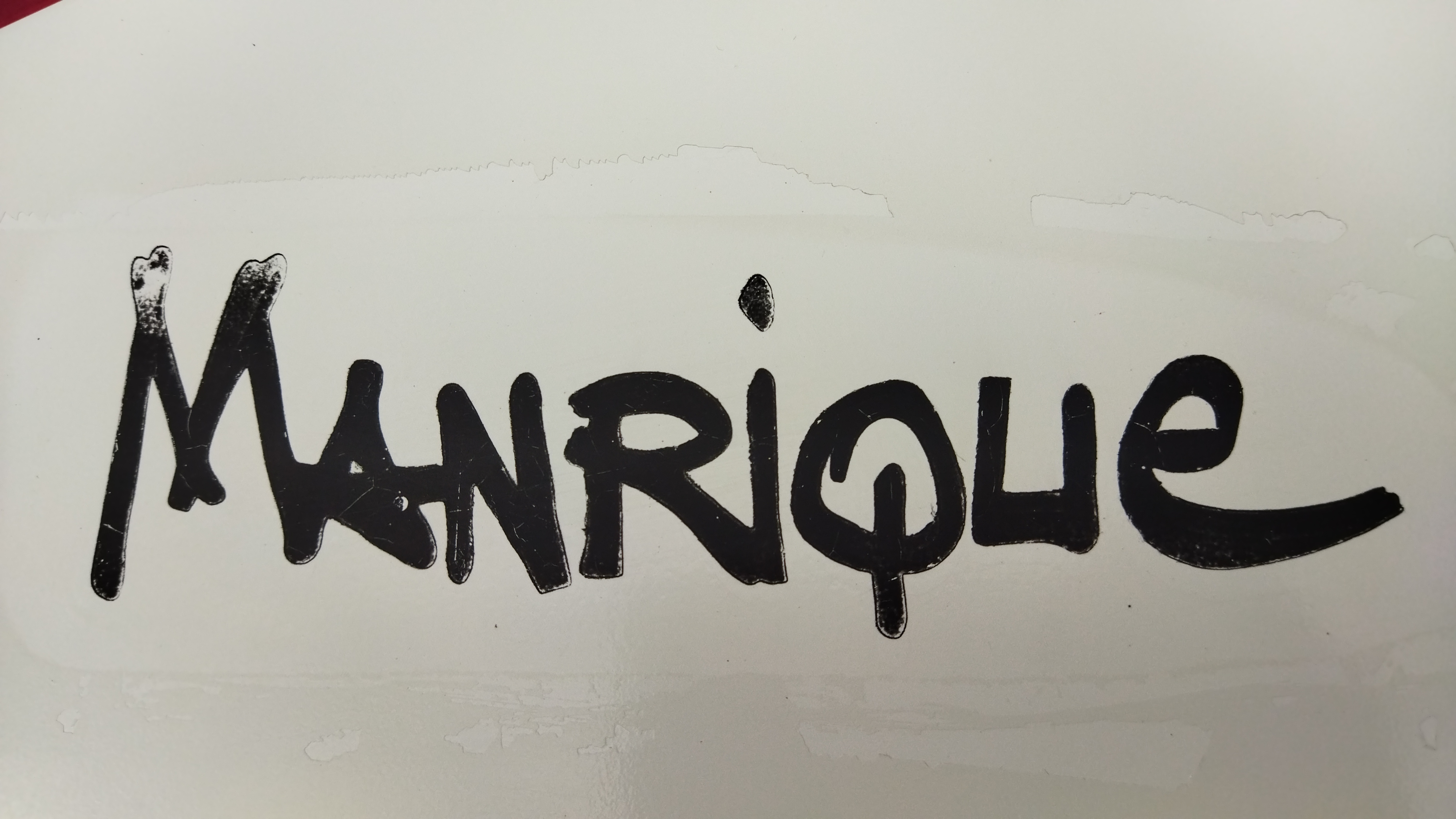
- Website: https://fcmanrique.org

César Manrique Cabrera (Spanish pronunciation: [ˈθesaɾ manˈrike] or [ˈsesaɾ manˈrike]) (24 April 1919 – 25 September 1992) was a Spanish artist, architect and nature activist from Lanzarote. He began work as a painter in 1939 after returning from the Spanish Civil War, and went on to influence early Spanish informalism and abstract art. He is however primarily known for his architectural projects in Lanzarote, constructed from the 1960s to 1990s. These were designed to promote sustainable tourism, while respecting the natural landscape and character of the island. As an activist, he worked to preserve the natural beauty and traditional architectural principles of Lanzarote, and was successful in his drive for regulation against high rise hotels. He was widely celebrated in his time, and continued designing naturalist structures until his death in 1992.

Manrique's contributions to the island of Lanzarote have delivered a lasting legacy. On the anniversary of his death in 1993, UNESCO declared the island a biosphere reserve in recognition of his conservation efforts. In 2019, the hundredth anniversary of his birth, the island's main airport was renamed in his honor. His foundation continues to advocate for natural conservation in the region today.

== Early life ==
Manrique was born in Arrecife, Lanzarote, one of the Canary Islands. His father Gumersindo Manrique, originally from Fuerteventura, built the family house in Caleta de Famara. Manrique himself once said this house and its surroundings has impressed him greatly. He demonstrated artistic talent from a young age. He was sometimes considered himself an "oddball" as he had unusual interests for a child like observing patterns in stones and the movement of insects. He drew frequently, though none of his juvenilia has survived. As he grew older he would make portraits of his family members.

He fought in the Spanish Civil War as a volunteer in the artillery unit on Franco's side. The violence of war troubled Manrique, and he would not talk about what he had experienced afterwards. He returned to Lanzarote in 1939, climbed on to the roof of his home, stripped off his military uniform and set fire to it. His experiences left him with a wish to produce uplifting, inspirational art. The civil war had a profound effect on him and his contemporaries, some of whom were killed or forced into exile.

== Career ==
=== Arrecife (1939-1945) ===
Manrique decided to work as a painter in 1939, after his return from the civil war. He held a number of exhibitions in the early 1940s to showcase his paintings. His first solo exhibition was in Arrecife in 1942 and others followed there and in Gran Canaria. He swiftly established the format that would guide his solo expositions from then until 1957, a mixture of more traditional paintings inspired by Lanzarote's geography, and then more fantastical or abstract scenes.

=== Madrid (1945-1964) ===
He moved to Madrid in 1945 and received a scholarship for the Art School of San Fernando, where he graduated as a teacher of art and painting. His decision to enter a prolonged period of study was considered unusual at the time, given that he was already moderately established as an artist and had been conducting solo exhibitions for three years. He lived with his partner Josefa "Pepi" Gómez, who came from a wealthy family and through whom he developed connections in the art world. They lived at two locations in Madrid over the period, and would regularly host "artists, architects, and poets, as well as ambassadors, politicians, business leaders and aristocrats" at social gatherings in their home. These connections would offer a means for Manrique to gain commissions for his artwork. While Manrique was very well connected with Madrid society, he avoided becoming involved with Francoist politics personally. He once stated that he preferred "to be an eagle rather than a sheep".

Madrid's art scene was at the time still recovering from the consequences of the civil war. The area suffered from widespread poverty, and many galleries had been closed in the 1930s. These were beginning to re-open with the gradual relaxation of Francoist isolationism early 1950s, and Spain once again began to take part in international art events. Critics have identified 1950 to 1953 as a key transitional period in Manrique's stylistic development, something which originated with two influences. This came from his membership of the Institute of Cinema Research and Experimentation, and a trip to Paris in 1950. He spent several months with an artist colony in the city, which had built up around the Spanish College. His time there exposed him to experienced artists of the area including Pablo Palazuelo and Eduardo Chillida among others. By 1953, his painting exhibited a more arbitrary use of colour and form, and intentionally child-like linework, showing reference to Mattisse and Picasso. He painted a number of well regarded murals at the Hotel Fénix, Banco Guipuzcoano and Barajas Airport. Spain's improving international reputation meant that Manrique was able to participate in the second Latin American Biennial in Havana in 1953.

His works in the period contributed to early Spanish informalism and abstract art. This was particularly apparent by the late 1950s, when other artists began to acknowledge his influence. He began to eschew bright colours and instead focused on material work. Manrique lavishly decorated his Madrid home with art, and designed several elements such as the lamps, chairs and ceramics. The art historian Carlos Diaz-Bertrana has suggested that this represented an early indication of how he had "spilled over beyond the canvas", by moving into other art forms. In 1959, he shared an exhibition with Maud Westerdahl, an enameller and art critic with whom he would develop a lasting friendship.

=== New York (1964-1966) ===
After the untimely death of Gómez in 1963, he felt the need to leave Madrid- which reminded him of her. On the advice of a cousin he moved to New York in 1964, where he stayed with the Cuban painter Waldo Diaz-Blart. A grant from Nelson Rockefeller allowed him to rent his own studio. He set up on the Lower East Side, where he could be close to the art scene that was present there at the time. He painted many works in New York, which were exhibited in the prestigious "Catherine Viviano" gallery as well as the Guggenheim Museum. His exhibitions at the Viviano in particular were foundational in his establishing a presence in the New York art scene, and more broadly the art market for North America. The period also saw him exposed to pop art.

By the time Manrique arrived in the city, the wave of abstract expressionism that had been prevalent in the 1950s had subsided. Manrique was at that time a Spanish informalist, a close relation to the abstract expressionist movement. In the thinking of New York's art critics, his work was therefore "a thing of the past". Manrique grew to dislike New York's culture and lack of natural settings, and came to miss the volcanic terrain and friendly people of Lanzarote.

I feel true nostalgia for the real meaning of things. For the pureness of the people. For the bareness of my landscape and for my friends... man in New York is like a rat. Man was not created for this artificiality. There is an imperative need to go back to the soil. Feel it, smell it. That's what I feel.

— César Manrique, letter to his friend Pepe Dámaso while living in New York

=== Lanzarote "Volcano Home" (1966-1988) ===
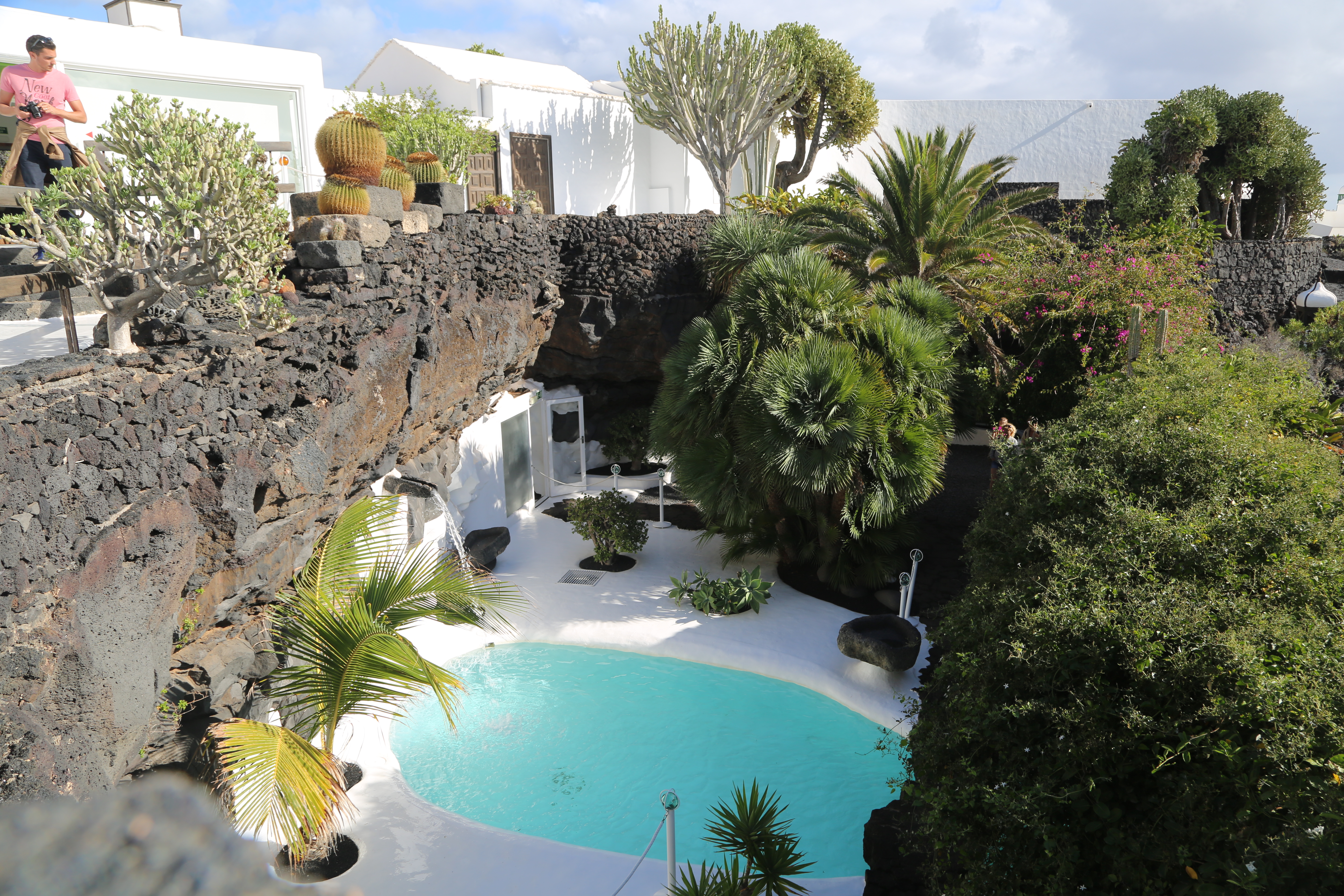
Manrique's volcanic house, 1968

Manrique returned to Lanzarote in 1966; the island would be his home for the remainder of his life. Upon arriving, he intended to start an artist's colony on the island. Pepín Ramírez, a childhood friend of Manrique as well as the president of the island helped Manrique realize this idea. While travelling in the volcanic plains left behind by the 1824 eruption, Manrique discovered a cave, and climbed down to discover several volcanic bubbles and a tunnel. He decided to develop the location into his home, and over several years excavated and augmented the caverns, adding above ground elements also. It would form the centrepiece of his "artist's colony" on the island, and a spot for regular nude, hedonistic parties. The site has been described as "the lair of a Bond villain who ditched world domination to throw the swingiest parties in town".

Manrique gained a lot of attention with his commitment to protect Lanzarote from what he regarded as pernicious tourist developments. Manrique was not against tourism on the island. On the contrary, he thought (high-quality) tourism should be the economic engine of the island. He had a major influence on the planning regulations on Lanzarote following his recognition of its potential for tourism and lobbied successfully to encourage the sustainable development of the industry. One aspect of this is the ban of high-rise hotels on the island, which do not fit the aesthetic harmony that should cover the entire island, according to Manrique. Those high buildings that were built before the ban are generally keeping with the use of traditional colors in their exterior decoration. Homeowners are encouraged to protect this visual unity by keeping the exterior of the houses white (with specific colors for the woodwork).

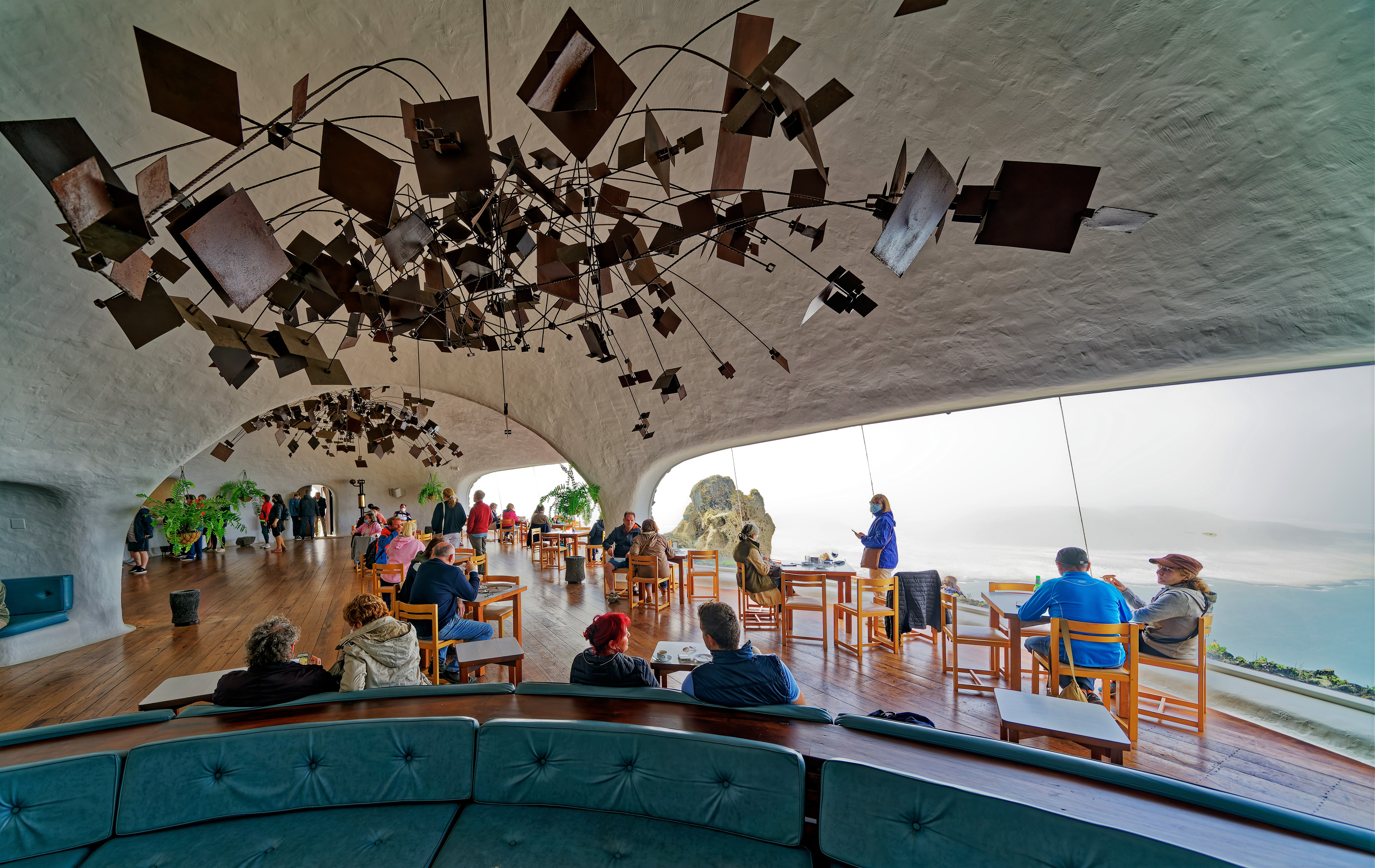
Mirador del Rio, 1973

With his goal in mind- helping improve tourism to the island while maintaining its natural beauty- Manrique spent much of the following 25 years designing and building structures, attractions, and public sculptures. An early example of this was the El Diablo restaurant (1970), which uses the heat of the Timanfaya volcano to cook food upon a well-like structure. The building has large panoramic windows which offer views of the volcanic landscape. He also designed the visitor center for the Timanfaya volcanic park as well as its devil symbol. This was followed by the Mirador del Río in 1973; a scenic overlook of the island which includes a cafe worked into the volcanic rock. Manrique published a book in 1974 called Architecture Unpublished, collaborating with the renowned Spanish architect Fernando Higueras.

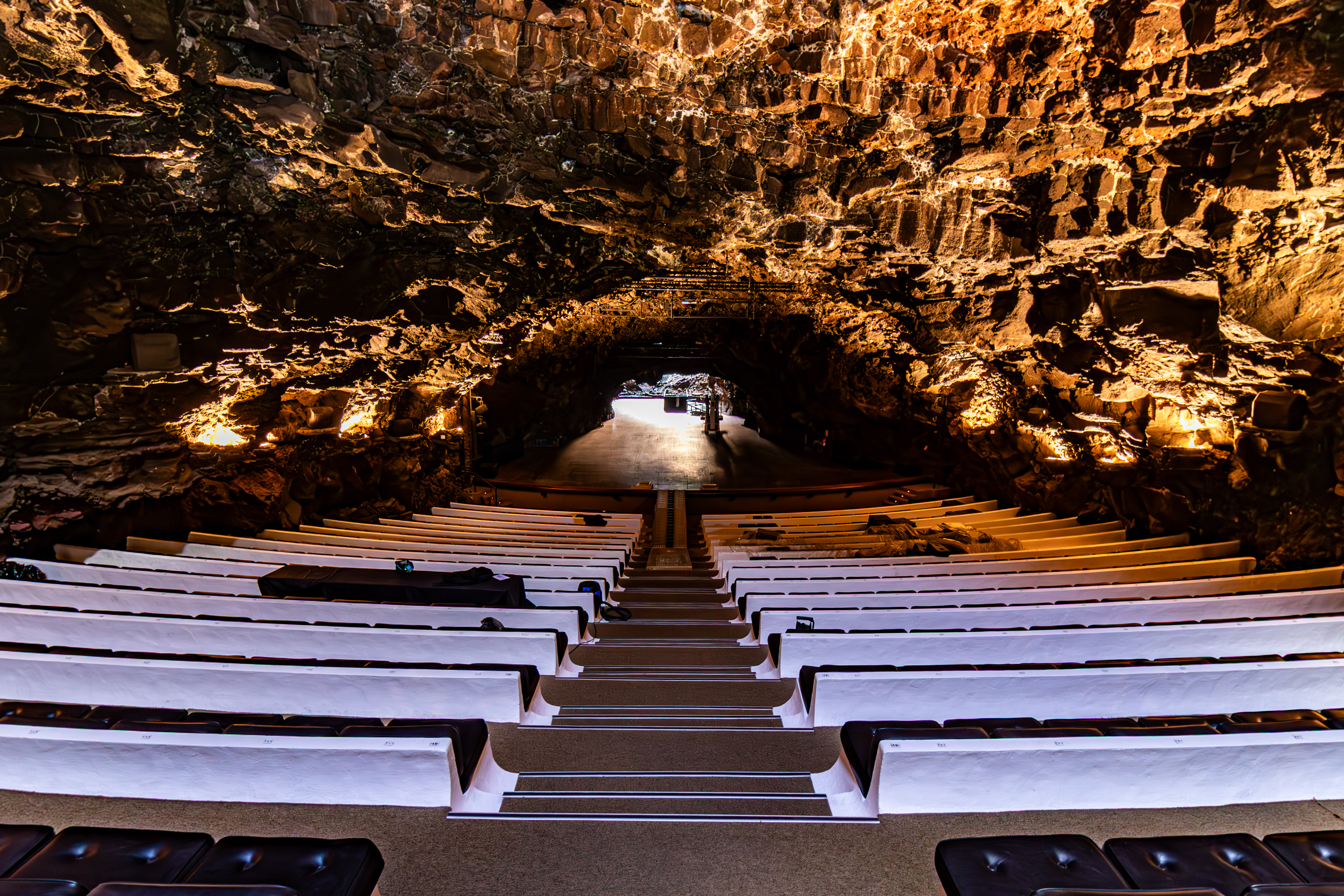
Jameos del Agua auditorium, 1977

In 1976, Manrique designed the overhaul of the Castillo de San José at Arrecife, which saw the historic structure refurbished. The fortress building became home to the International Museum of Contemporary Art, which showcases the work of both Canarian and international artists. He also developed the restaurant on site. Manrique worked on an extensive remodeling and excavation program of the volcanic caverns at Jameos del Agua through the 1970s, adding an auditorium among other changes. Manrique desired to respect the natural formations of the cavern in his works, stating that "the most important aspect of art is nature. In Jameos del Agua, I did nothing more than underline the beauty that was already there." It opened to the public in 1977.

Manrique was particularly active in the mid 1980s in campaigning against large building developments. The plans would have seen tourism accommodation quadruple in Lanzarote, through the construction of large apartment complexes and hotels; critics argued that it would have led to uncontrolled growth. Manrique referred to the plans as "suicide" for the island. He was involved in a number of marches and protests, which were ultimately successful in having several of these developments scaled back or outright cancelled. Tourism growth did occur, but in a more managed and regulated way as a result of these protests.

=== Haria and final works (1988-1992) ===
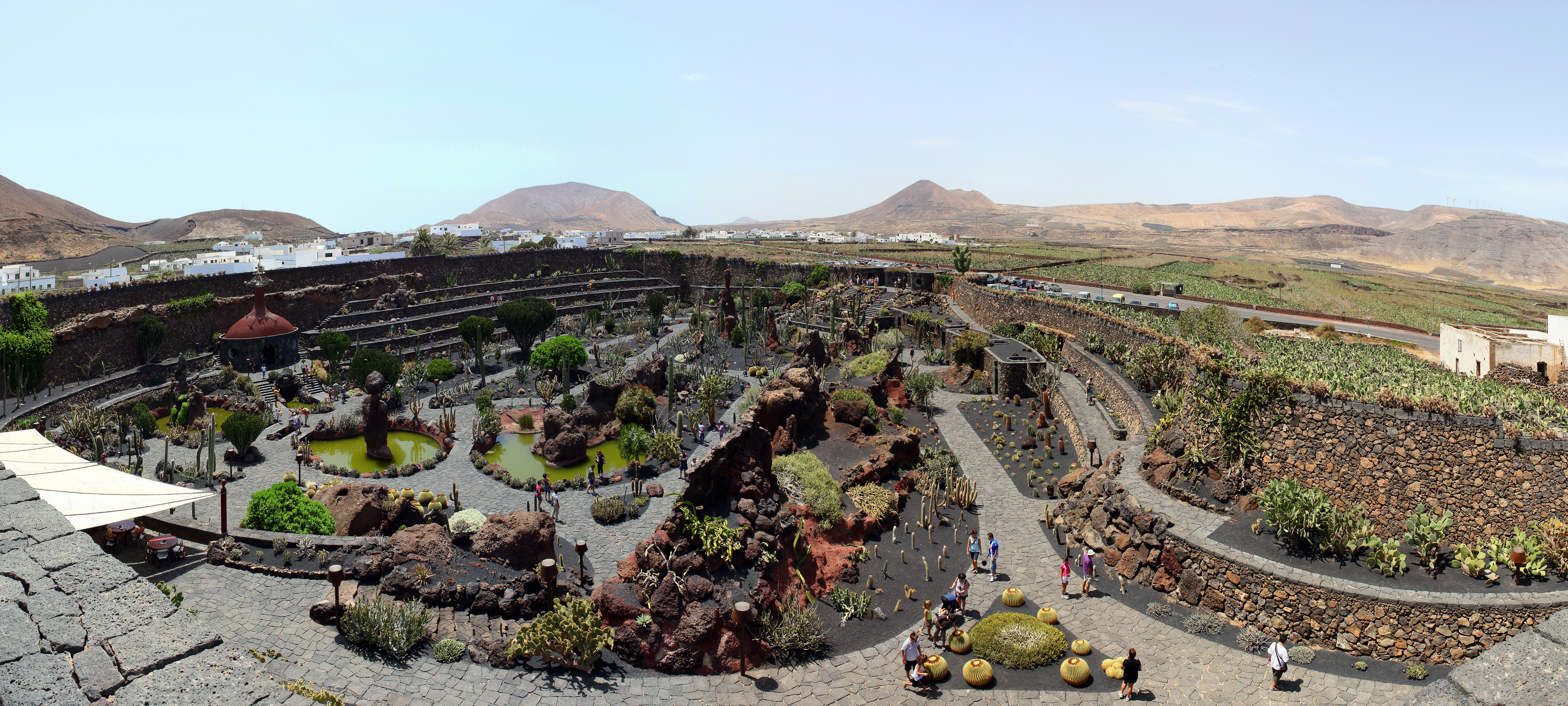
Jardín de cactus, 1991

In the late 1980s, Manrique made the decision to move out of his elaborate volcano home. He designed a new, more simple Palm Grove House in the small Lanzarote village of Haria which would become his permanent residence, while redeveloping the volcano home into an art gallery. For this purpose, he launched the César Manrique Foundation. The goal of this group was to provide public access to the property as well as to further his goals of art, education and nature conservation in the Canary Islands, particularly Lanzarote. Though Manrique was in his early 70s by that point, he remained active, and in 1989 began work on the Jardin de Cactus at Guatiza, a vast garden in a remote area of the island containing hundreds of species of cactus and an elaborate restaurant. The site opened in 1991, and was his last major contribution to the landscape of the island.

In 1990, he created one of the BMW Art Cars as a collaboration with the German designer and paint artist Walter Maurer. Their collaboration for the international automobile company increased Manrique's fame beyond the country's borders. Manrique maintained a close friendship with Walter Maurer for the rest of his life, and was involved in a constant artistic exchange. Before the collaboration with César Manrique, Maurer had already designed BMW Art Cars with other highly recognised international artists such as Andy Warhol, Frank Stella and Roy Lichtenstein. The work for the joint Art Car was carried out in Maurer's studio in Munich. César Manrique took care of the initial design proposals, coordinated them with his artistic partner Walter Maurer and was responsible for the final approval, while Maurer was responsible for applying the design to the BMW 730i.

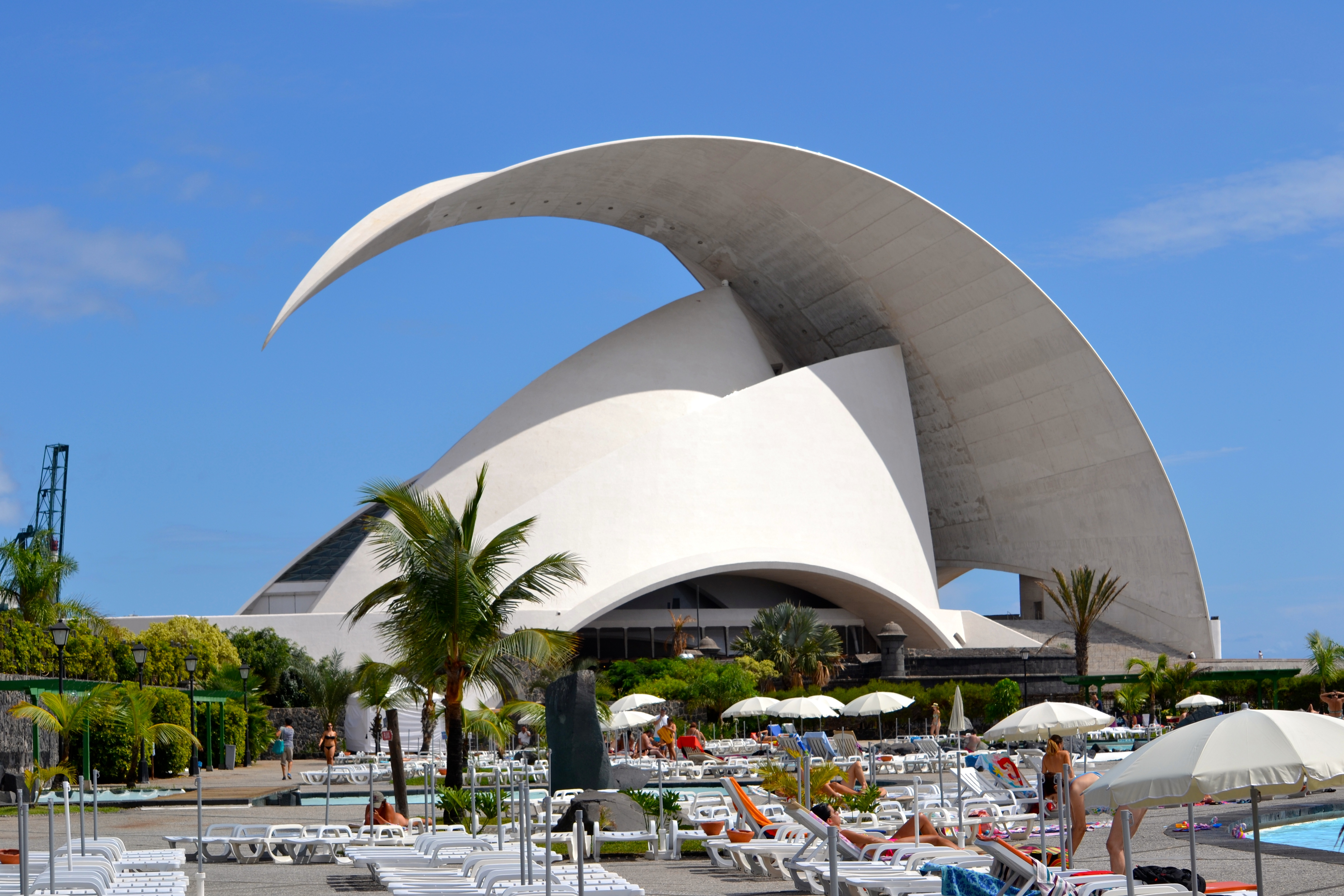
Parque Marítimo César Manrique, 1995

Manrique's final artistic works were his wind toys- dynamic sculptures that are animated by the wind. The first installed was Veleta in Arrieta. Many of them went on to be constructed after his death, based on the notes and drawings he left behind. The last building credited to the artist was the Parque Marítimo César Manrique which opened in Tenerife in 1995.

== Personal life ==
Manrique met his partner Joesfa "Pepi" Gómez in 1945 when he moved to Madrid. The two have been described as a wedded couple, though legally they never married. This was due to Gómez's previous husband, who likely died in the Spanish Civil War, but as no body was ever found Gómez was unable to prove she was a widow. Gómez and Manrique remained together until her death in 1963. Her death devastated Manrique, and prompted his decision to live in New York for a period in the mid 1960s. Discussing her death later, Manrique stated: "Until her death I was like a small child, who didn't worry about anything, except painting... Every corner of my house in Madrid smelled like Pepi. So I decided to go to New York."

The César Manrique foundation has stated that he was likely bisexual, something that "added to his scandalous image" in an otherwise more socially conservative Francoist Spain. He was friends with a great many artists including Andy Warhol. He had a reputation for nude, hedonistic parties, and would frequently host these gatherings at his home in Lanzarote. He was however a non-drinker and non-smoker, and was passionate about his health and fitness.

== Death & legacy ==
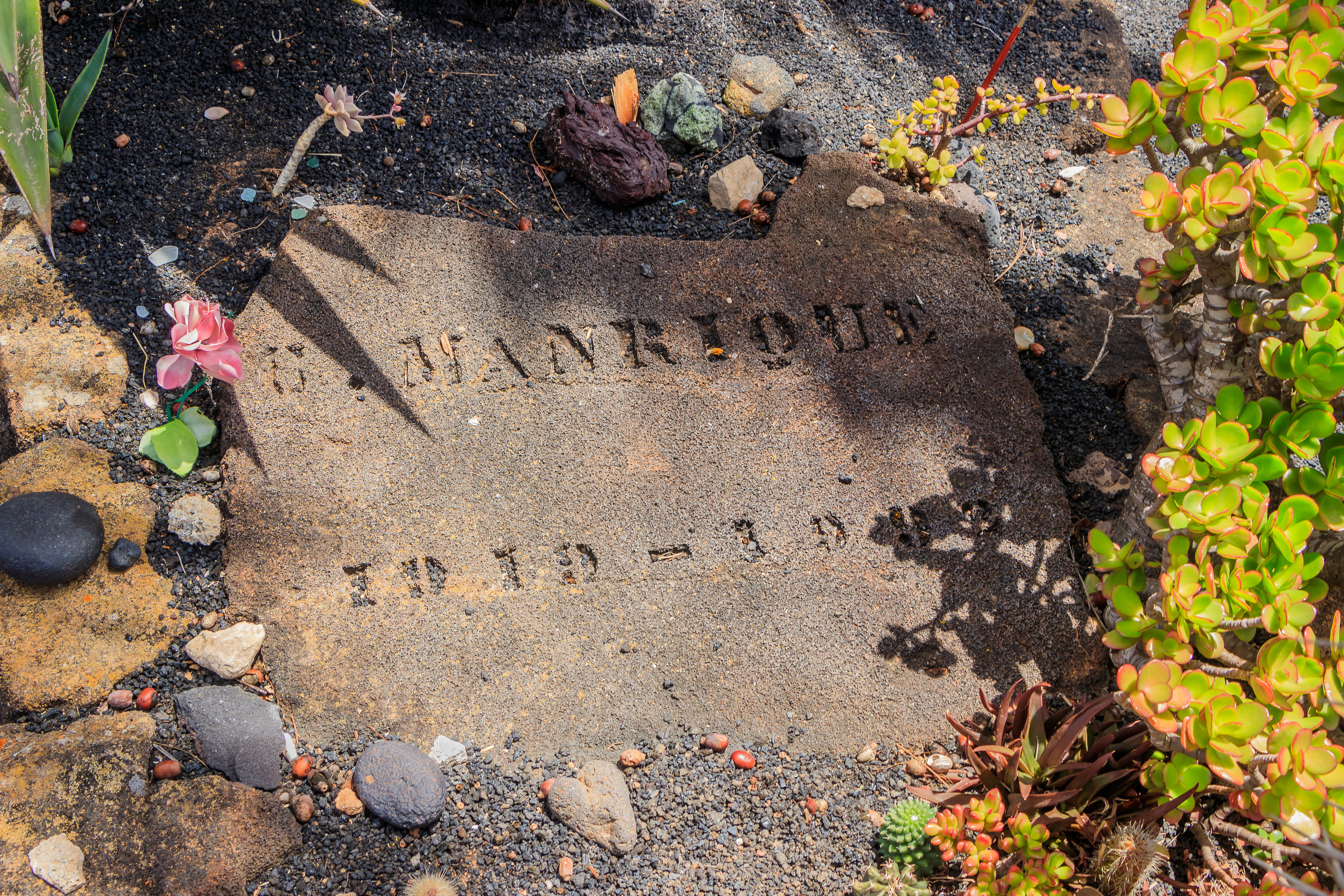
Manrique's grave

On September 25, 1992, Manrique suffered a fatal car accident. He had recently undergone cataract surgery and was not meant to be driving, however the driver assigned to him by the Cabildo had called in sick and he had decided to drive himself. His car was struck at a roundabout in Tahíche, Teguise, just outside the Fundación, his Lanzarote home. He was aged 73.

After the accident, one of Manrique's wind toys, Fobos, was installed to mark the location. He was buried in a cemetery in Haría. On the anniversary of his death in 1993, UNESCO declared the island a biosphere reserve in recognition of Manrique's work on nature and sustainability.

== César Manrique Foundation ==
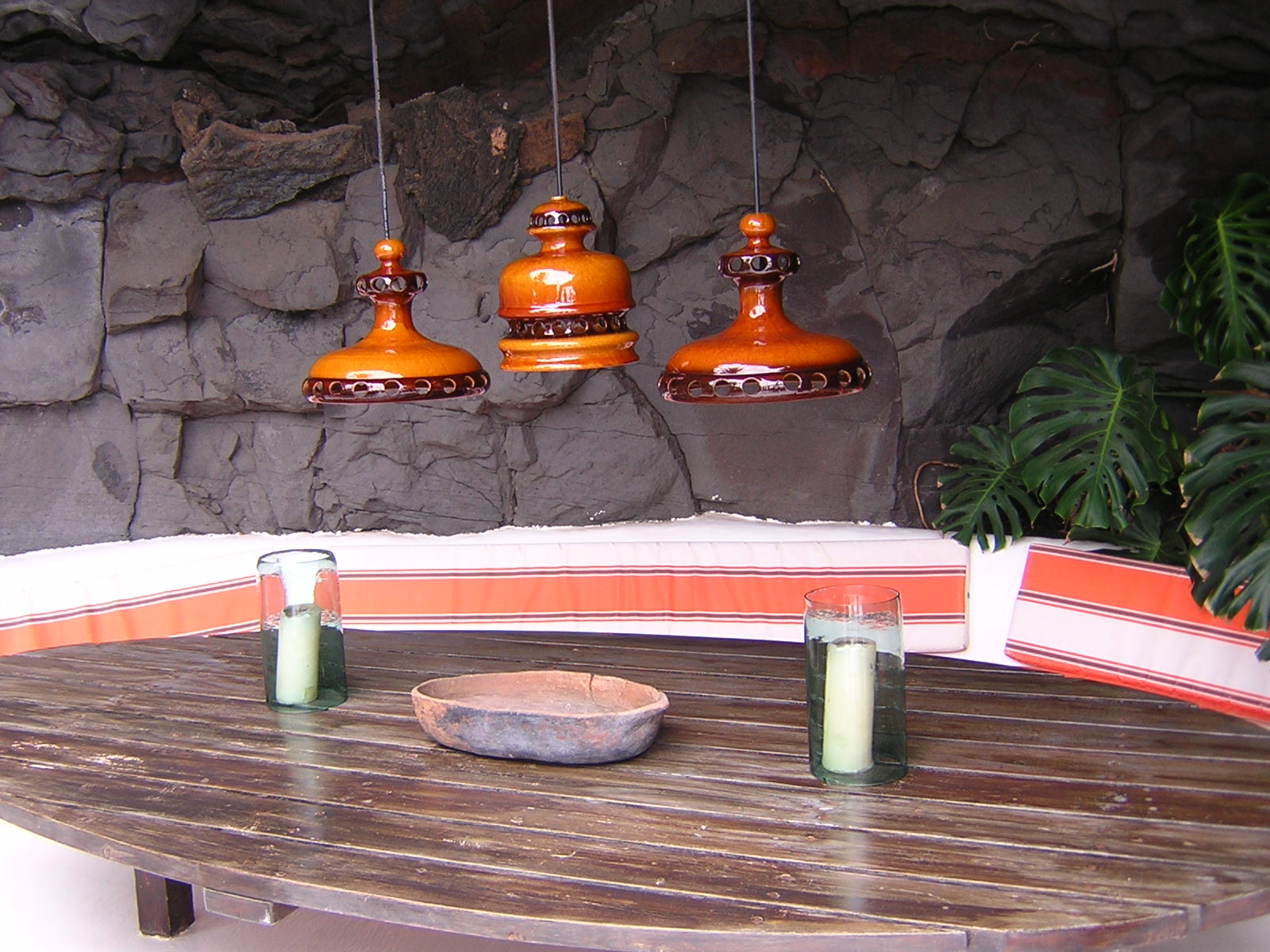
One of the living spaces created within the volcanic bubble

The César Manrique Foundation is a private, non-profit organisation which was set up by the artist in 1983 with four "pillars" to guide its activities. These are:

- Conserving César Manrique's legacy, including managing some of the buildings he designed.
- The visual arts, including organising exhibitions and studies of art and nature.
- Environment and land use, including conservation work in the Canary Islands.
- Cultural reflection, including intellectual and creative activities.

The foundation is based at Manrique's former volcano home, and became active after his death in 1992. The site has become an art gallery featuring both works from Manrique himself as well as pieces he acquired, such as original sketches by Pablo Picasso and Joan Miró. One of the foundation's fundamental missions is to oppose the spread of high-rise concrete across the Spanish coastline and her islands. In 2010, the foundation brought attention to 24 illegally erected hotels in Lanzarote.

== Works ==
=== Architecture ===
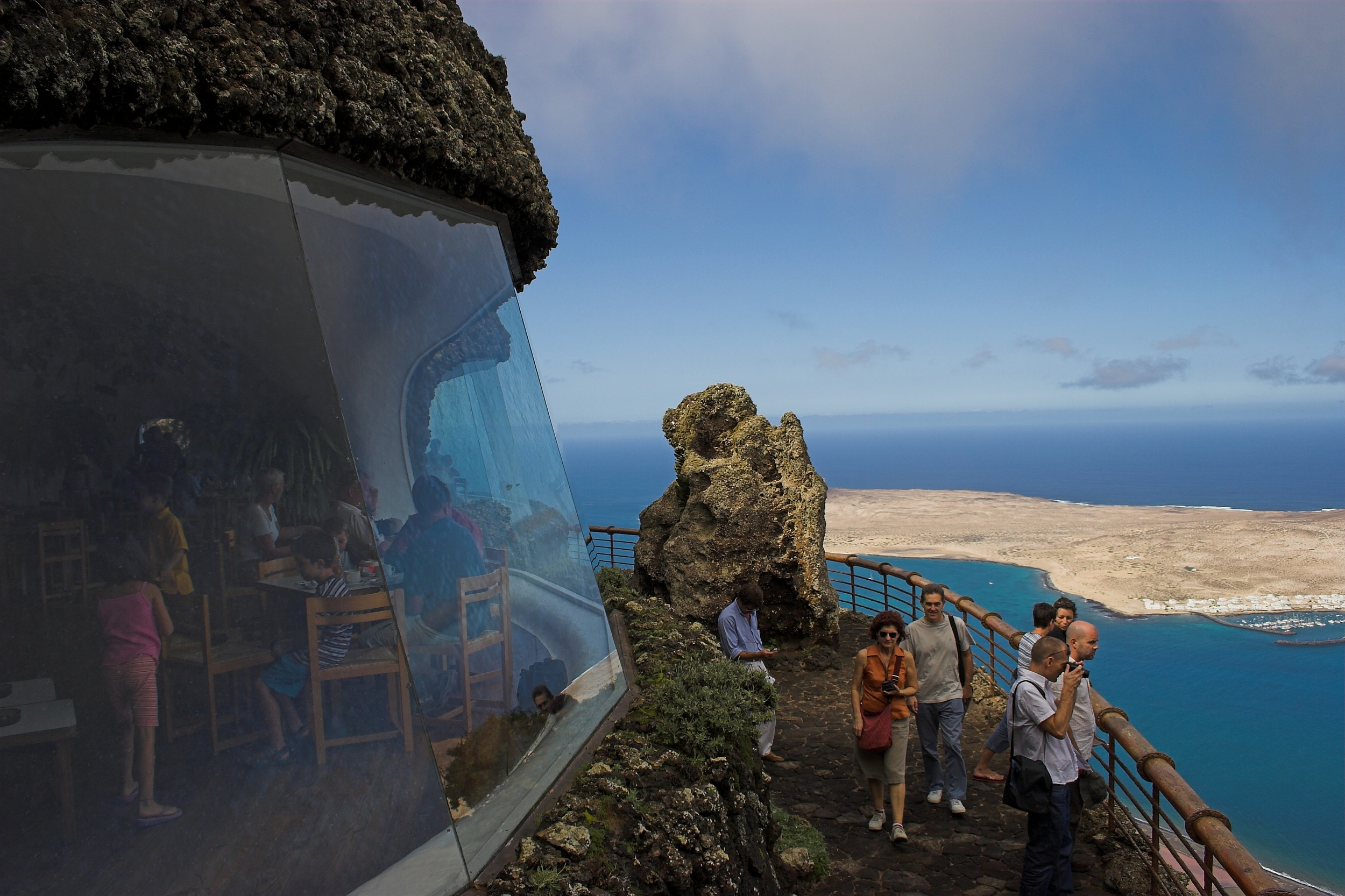
Mirador del Rio

In Lanzarote:

- 1968- Taro de Tahíche (Manrique's house near Teguise, the present seat of the Fundación César Manrique).
- 1970- El Diablo Restaurant (uses volcanic heat to cook).
- 1972- LagOmar, house briefly owned by Omar Sharif. Collaboration with Jesús Rafael Soto.
- 1973- Mirador del Rio (overlooking the neighbouring island of Graciosa).
- 1976- International Museum of Contemporary Arts in the Castillo de San José, Arrecife.
- 1977- Jameos del Agua (concert venue/nightclub for 600 persons in a cave).
- 1977- Murals, garden and swimming pools of the five-star hotel Las Salinas in Costa Teguise.
- 1988- Casa / Museo César Manrique (Manrique's house and artist studio in Haria, with landscaped garden).
- 1991- Jardín de Cactus (a cactus garden home to over 1,100 different varieties of cactuses near Guatiza).

Outside Lanzarote:

- 1977- Lago Martiánez (large "semi natural" open air sea-water pool complex in Puerto de la Cruz, Tenerife).
- 1983- La Vaguada Shopping Centre in Madrid.
- 1989- La Peña (a restaurant and belvedere on El Hierro).
- 1989- Mirador del Palmarejo (a lookout point in La Gomera).
- 1992- Canarian Pavilion (Expo 92, Seville, Spain).
- 1995- Parque Marítimo César Manrique, Santa Cruz de Tenerife, Tenerife (construction finished after his death)

=== Sculpture ===
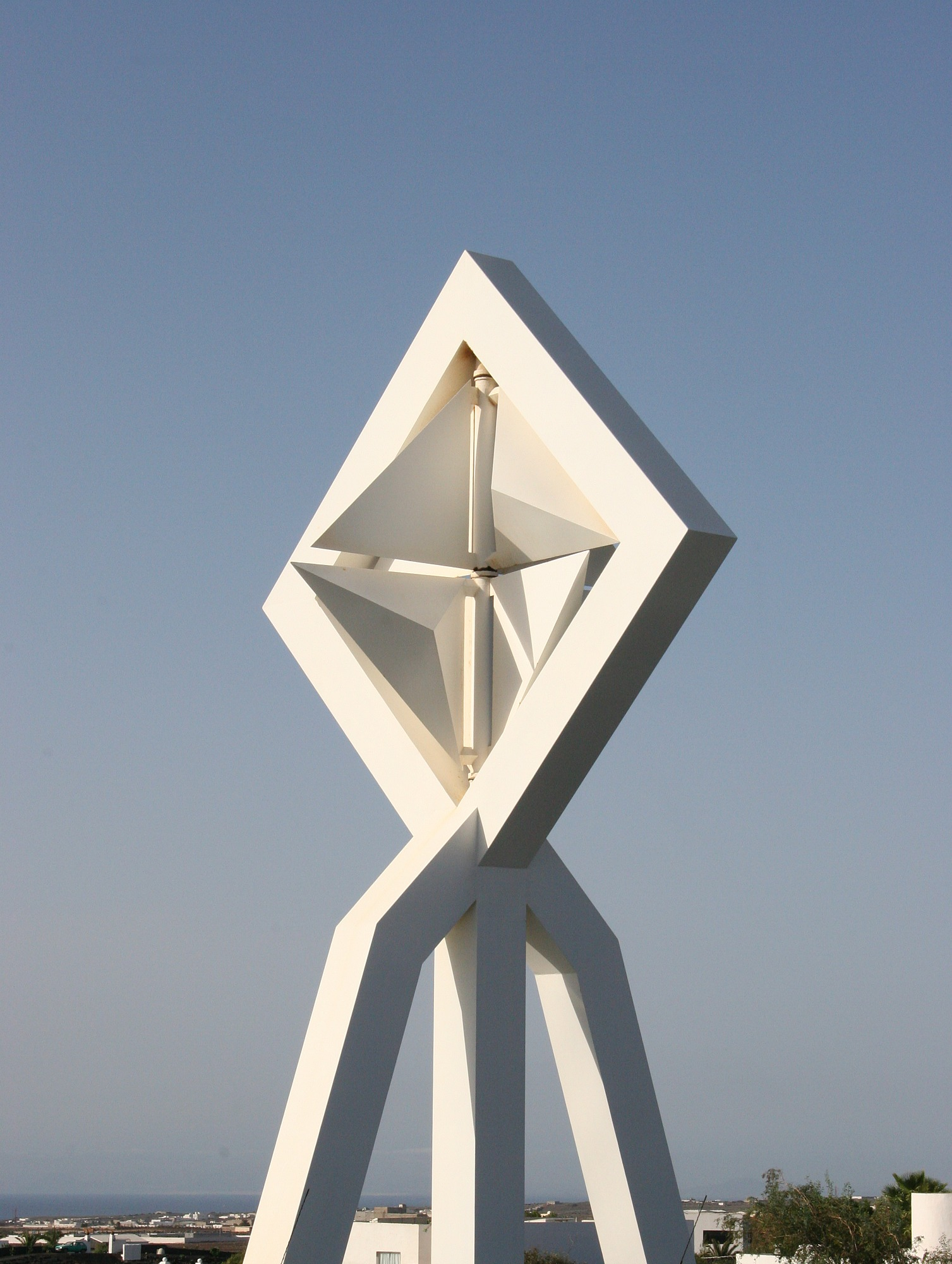
Wind Toy by César Manrique

- 1968- Monumento And Museo del Campesino (Monument at San Bartolomé dedicated to agricultural workers)
- 1970- El Diablo, symbol of the Timanfaya National Park.
- c. 1970-1975- Sin título. Serie Juguetes del viento.
- 1990- El triunfador
- 1990- Vane, wind toy in Arrieta
- 1990- Energy Of The Pyramid, wind toy in the grounds of the Fundacion.
- 1994- Fobos, wind toy in Tahiche, marks the location of his death

=== Other ===
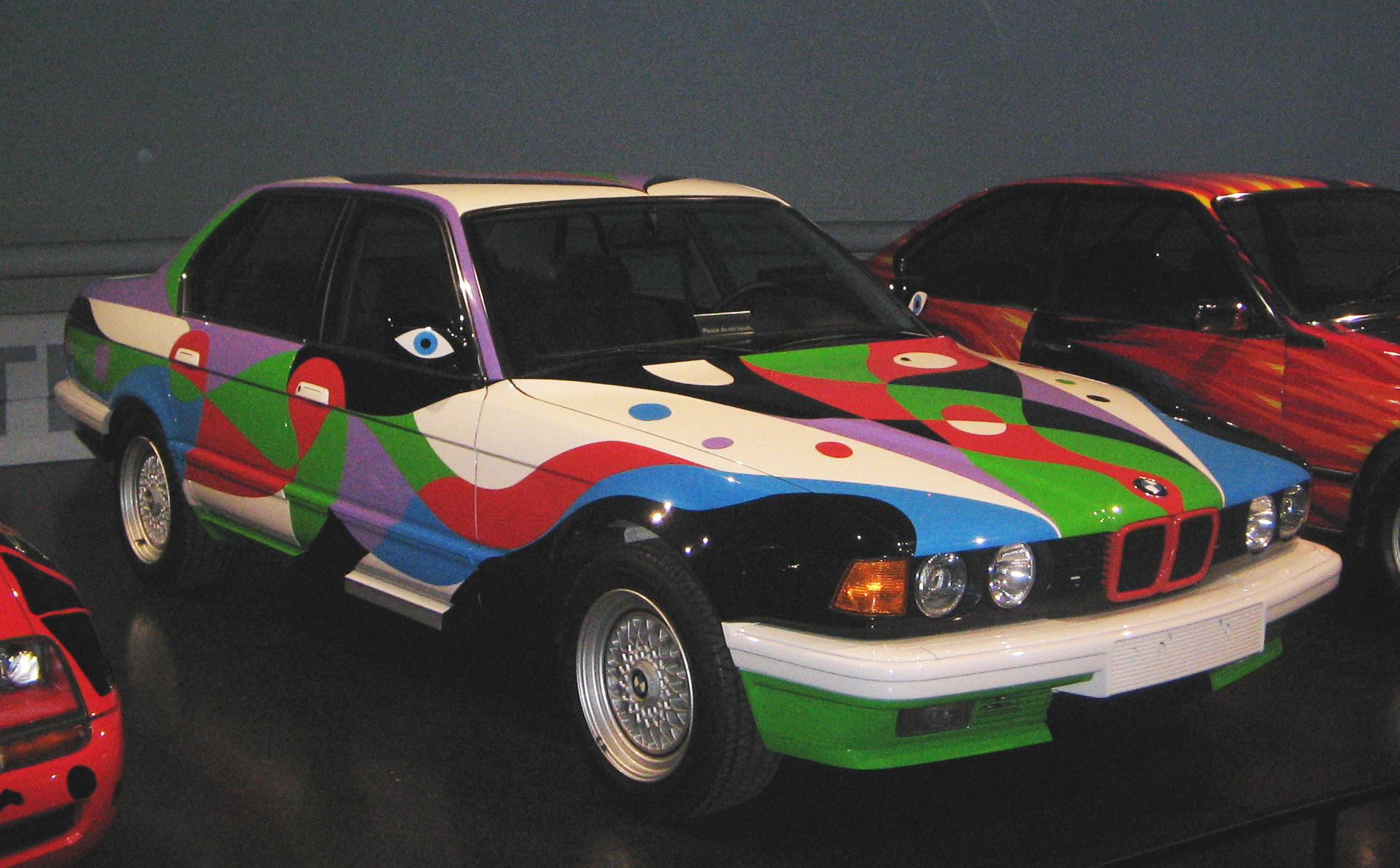
Art Car, exhibition at the BMW Museum in Munich

- 1990- BMW Art Car in collaboration with Walter Maurer, Munich, Germany.

== Honours ==
- 1976 Gold Medal for Tourism Merit
- 1978 Grand Cross of the Order of Civil Merit
- 1978 Weltpreis für Ökologie und Tourismus, Berlin, Germany
- 1980 Order of Andrés Bello
- 1980 Gold Medal of Merit in the Fine Arts
- 1986 Europa Nostra Prize European Parliament
- 1989 Art Prize, Canarian government
- 1989 Fritz Schumacher Prize at the Leibniz University Hannover, Germany
- 1999 honorary doctorate of the University of Las Palmas, Gran Canaria
- 2019 Medal of Honor, University of La Laguna.

== Additional images ==
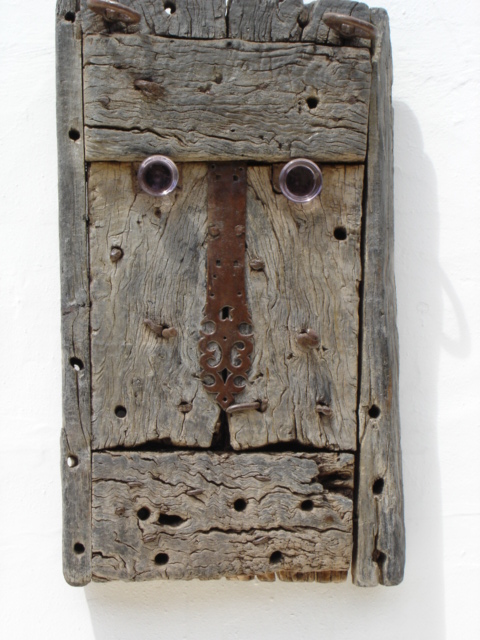
Manrique Foundation; outside (Lanzarote)

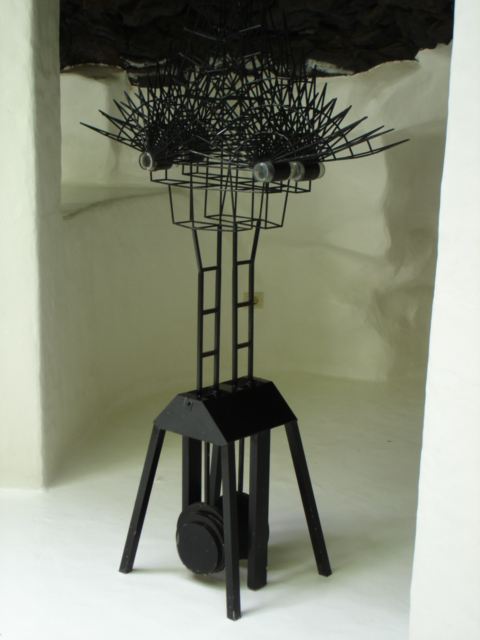
Manrique Foundation; inside (Lanzarote)

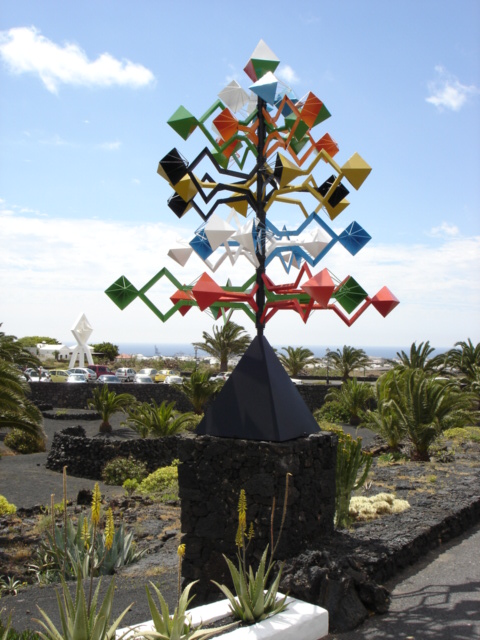
Wind sculpture (Lanzarote)

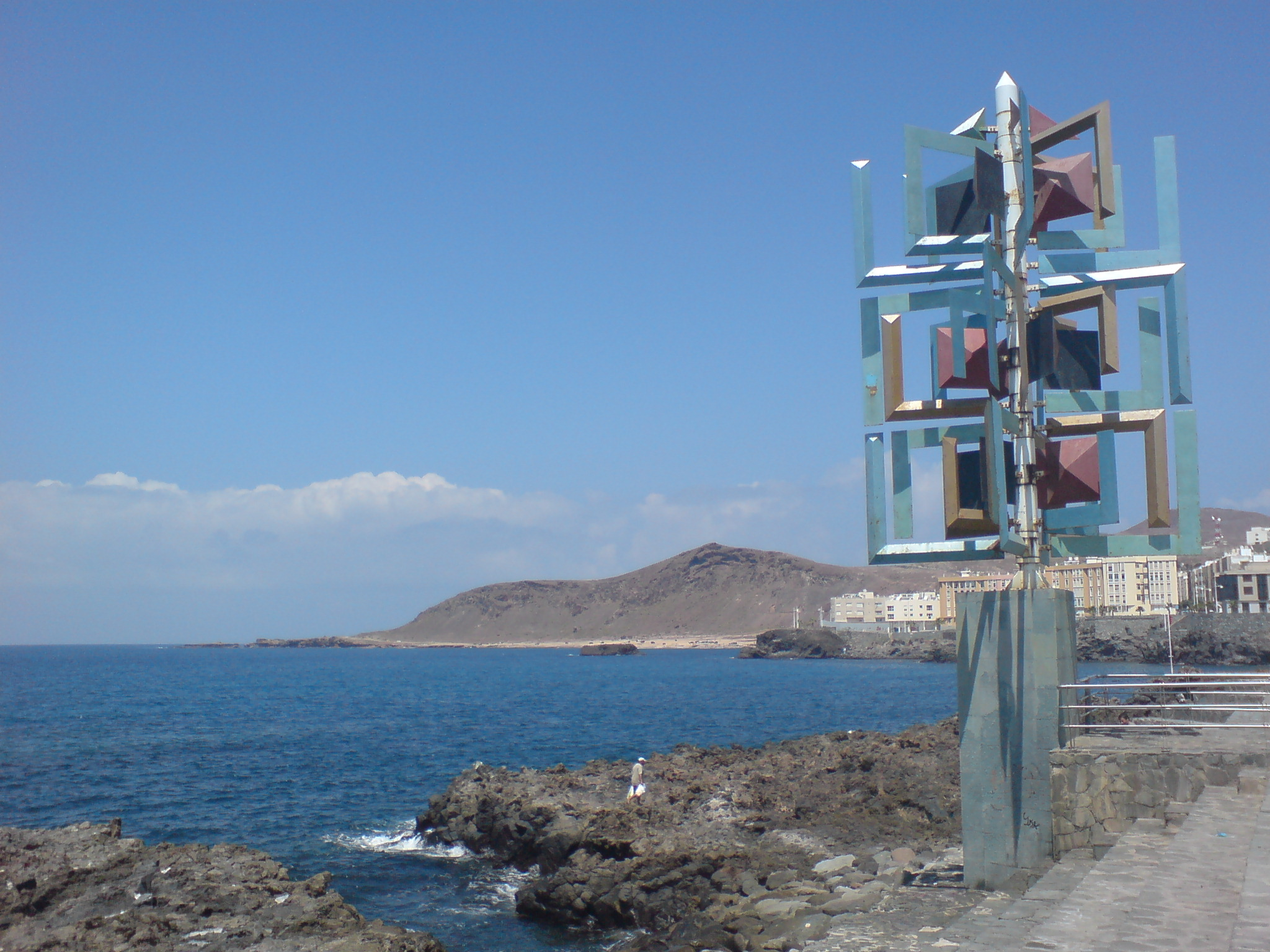
Wind sculpture (Las Palmas de Gran Canaria)

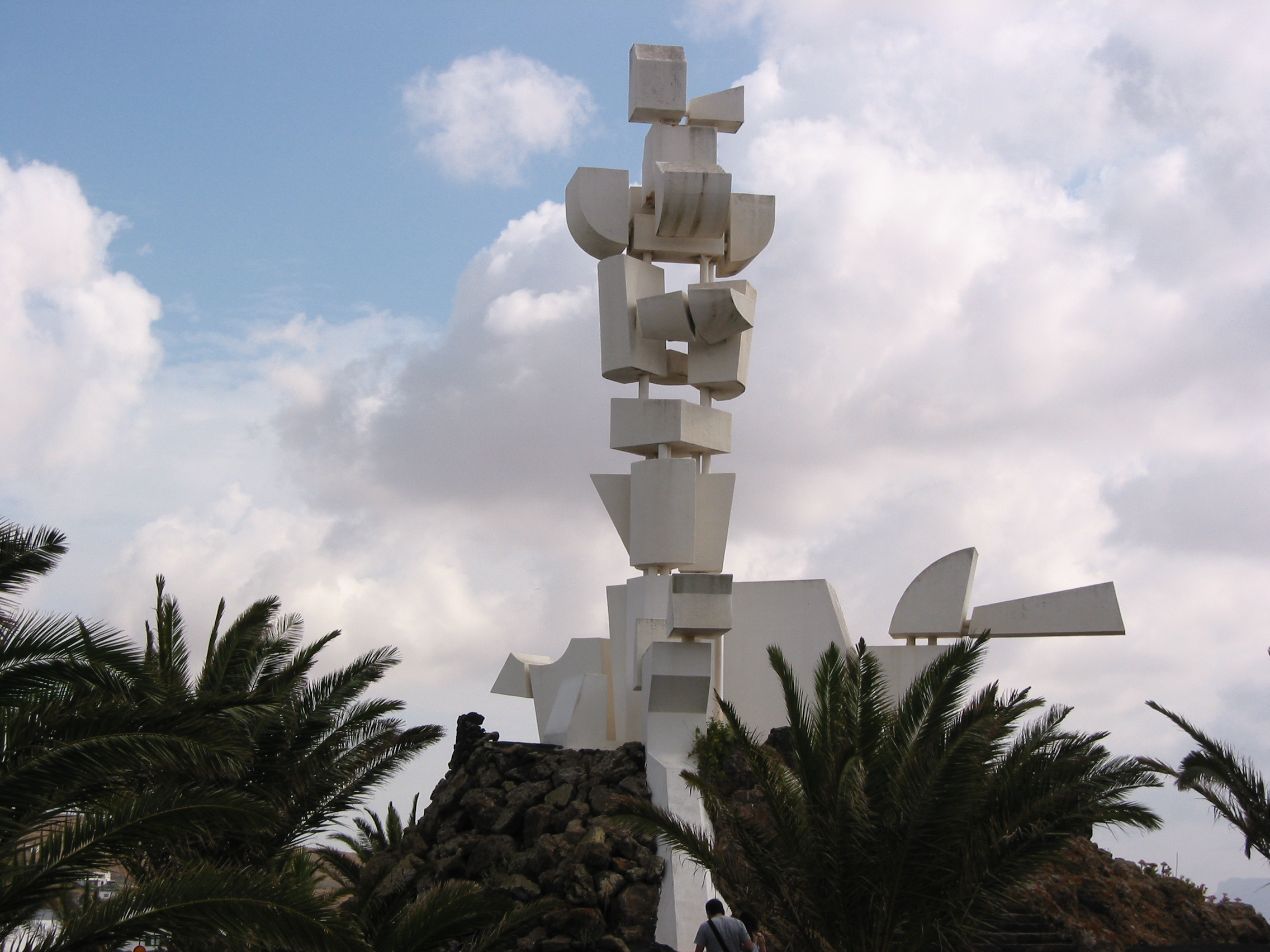
Monument to the peasant (Lanzarote)

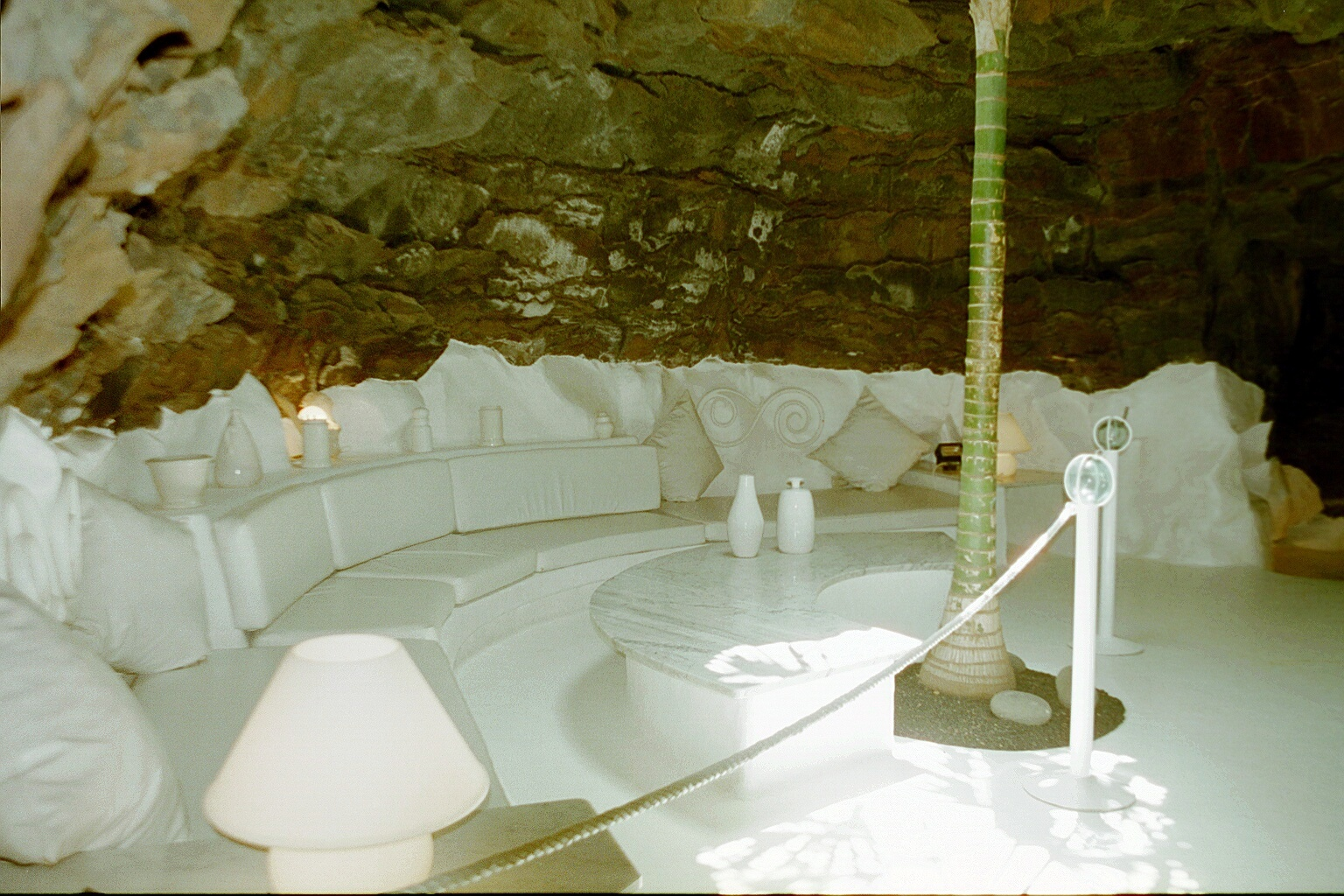
Taro Tahiche (Lanzarote)

== See also ==
- List of single-artist museums
