= Lago Martiánez =

Coordinates: 28°25′10″N 16°32′37″W

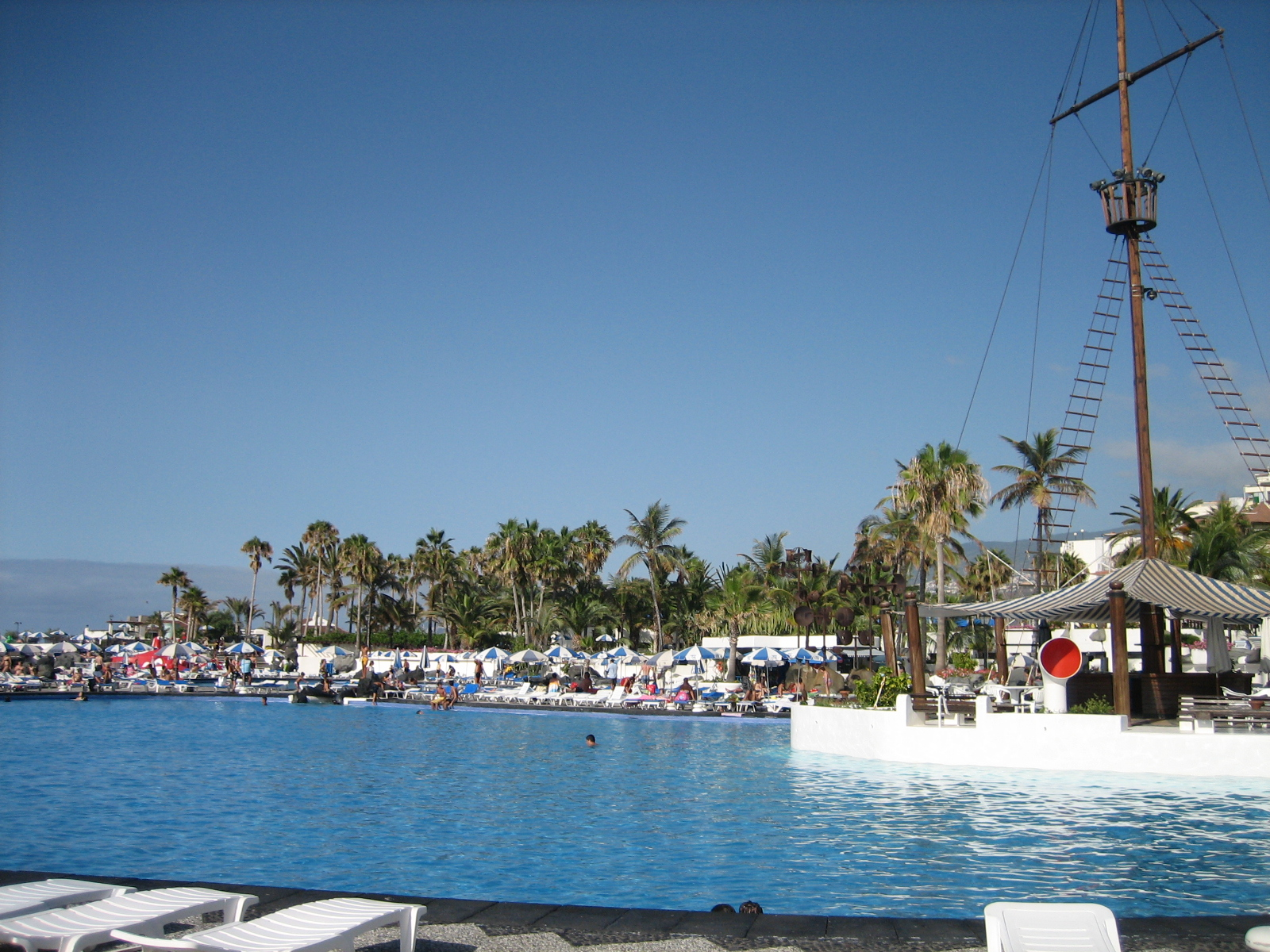
Lago Martiánez

Lago Martiánez is an open-air swimming pool complex located in Puerto de la Cruz (Tenerife, Canary Islands, Spain). The leisure park with a total area of approximately 100,000 square meters is centered around an artificial lake. Lago Martiánez includes several islands, gardens, restaurants, bars, and terraces. Architect César Manrique designed the swimming pool complex with many volcanic rocks. Lago Martiánez is a mix of Manrique’s vision and local elements, such as bartizans, palisades and ocean views. In addition to the architectural structure, it also comprises a range of Manrique’s sculptures. Lago Martiánez, commonly known as "el Lago", was built in the so-called "Llanos de Martiánez" area, which was home to several natural pools (such as "la Coronela" and "la Soga"). The first tourists visited Llanos de Martiánez at the end of the 19th century and at the beginning of the 20th century.

== First stage ==
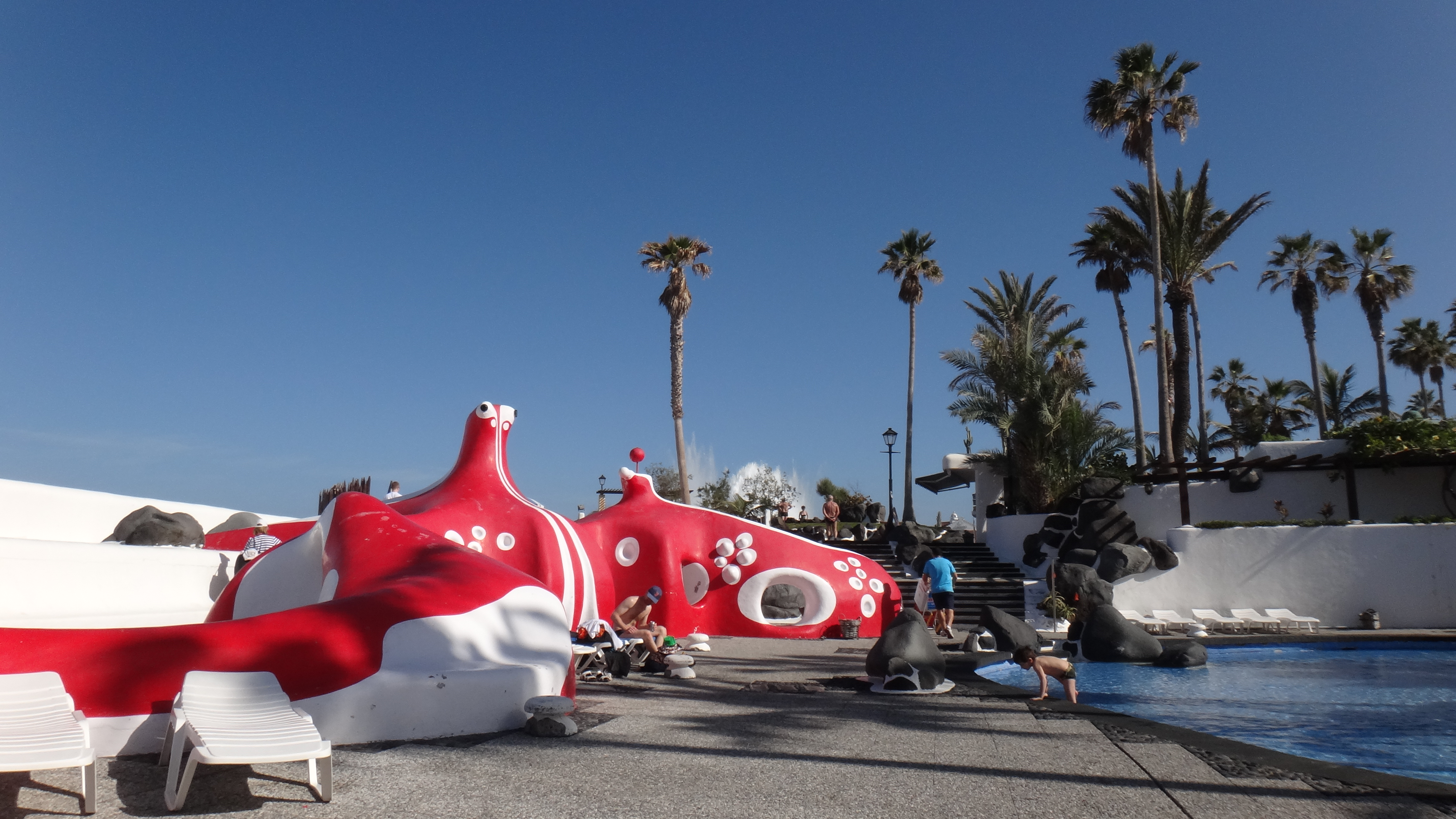
Lago Martiánez children's pool

The project’s first stage involved the area of the municipal pools, formerly known as "los Alisios". Engineer Juan Alfredo was responsible for the technical aspects, while César Manrique was in charge of the creative and artistic elements. Manrique combined his architectural spirit with the traditional architecture of the Canary Islands, incorporating flora and fauna elements, alongside authentic and innovative sculptures. ‘Los Alisios’ and "la Jibia" (cuttlefish) are two examples of such sculptures. Lago Martiánez was inaugurated in 1971, when its total area covered 8,000 square meters, and included two adult swimming pools, one children’s pool, and two bars (‘los Alisios’ and ‘la Isla’). The leisure park is equipped with technical-mechanical installations that are used for multiple purposes, such as filling the pools with sea water. Those facilities are incorporated in accordance with Lago Martiánez’ artistic character.

== Second stage ==
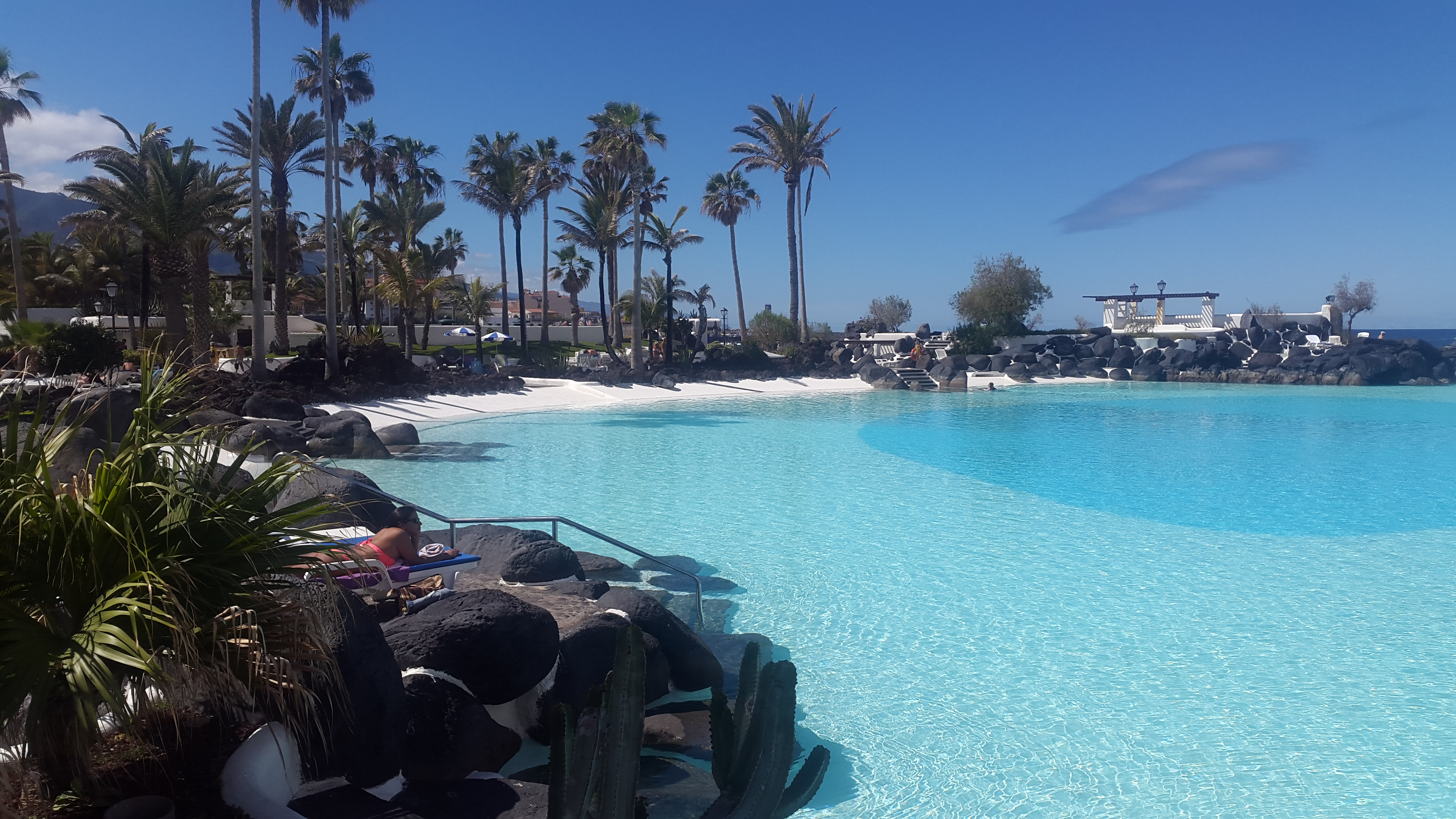
Lago Martiánez artificial lake

After completion of the first stage, the same technical and artistic team continued with the next phase in 1975, which ended on 30 April 1977. The second stage included construction of an artificial lake, shaped like a huge, green emerald, filled with sea water and surrounded by beaches, gardens and solariums. The artificial lake and its islands cover 33,000 square meters, including 15,000 square meters of water.

== Renovation and improvements ==
Between 2004 and 2006, Lago Martiánez underwent extensive renovations and improvements, including illumination of the pools and promenades. The Fundación César Manrique, which protects the artist’s works, supervised the works. The renewed park was inaugurated in July 2006. Sala Andrómeda, located on the lake’s center island, houses Puerto de la Cruz’ casino, which used to be located inside Hotel Taoro.
