= Tahíche =

Village located in Teguise, Lanzarote, Spain

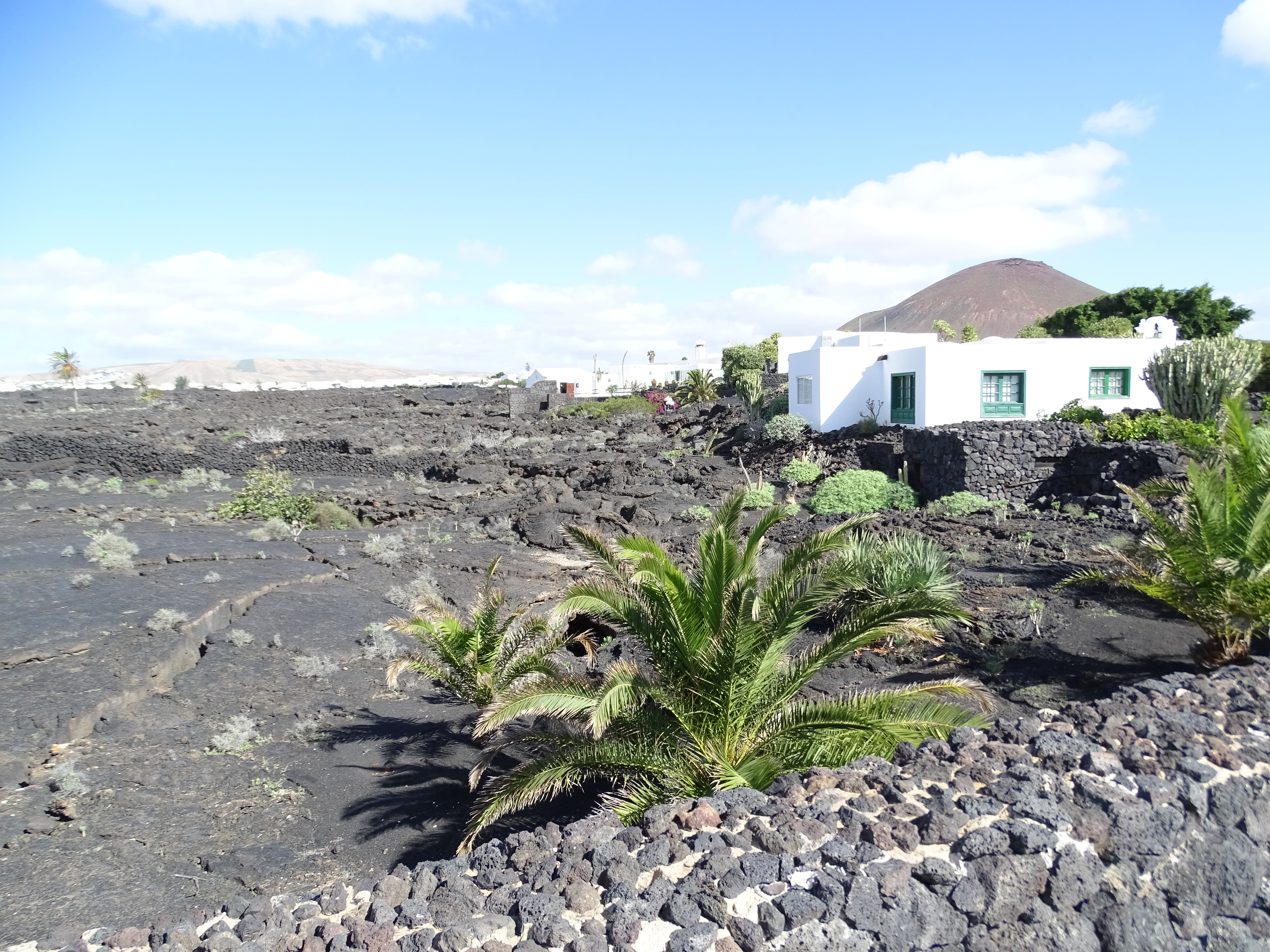
- Tahíche in November 2016

- Location within Lanzarote Location within Canary Islands
- Coordinates: 29.013°N 13.549°W
- Country: Spain
- Autonomous community: Canary Islands
- Province: Las Palmas
- Island: Lanzarote

Population (2009)
  - Total: 3,865
- Time zone: UTC+00:00 (WET)
  - Summer (DST): UTC+01:00 (WEST)
- Postcode: 35507

Tahíche is a village located in the municipality of Teguise on the island of Lanzarote. According to the 2009 census (INE), it had a population of 3,865, in 2011 a population of 4,101.

Spanish artist and architect César Manrique (1919–1992) lived in Tahíche. The foundation created by Manrique is located in Tahíche.

Tahíche is further home to the headquarters of various associations and institutions on the island like the centres dependent on the University of Las Palmas de Gran Canaria, the Lanzarote School of Tourism, the School of Nursing, the Lanzarote Association for the Disabled "ADISLAN", the "SARA" Animal Protection Society and the Lanzarote Penitentiary.
