= The Palace of Heavenly Pleasure =

2004 novel by Adam Williams

- Author: Adam Williams
- Language: English
- Published: 2004, Thomas Dunne Books
- Publication place: United States
- Media type: Print
- Pages: 640 pages
- ISBN: 031231566X

The Palace of Heavenly Pleasure is a 2003 novel by Adam Williams. The book was first published on November 25, 2004, through Thomas Dunne Books. The book is set during 1899 in China and is told through the viewpoint of multiple protagonists.

== Synopsis ==
The book's story is told in three parts.

Part One sets the scene, with the various character's arrivals and meetings. Helen Frances meets Henry Manners and begins to grow affectionate. The brothel is introduced. The Boxers watch as spirits appear within the sky.

Part Two develops the political aspects of the story and begins to demonstrate the influence of different powers within China. Later, the attacks against foreigners increase and the Airtons are forced to flee the town. Execution of foreigners, watched by the Airtons, as they hide in the brothel. Escape from the town, by means of train. Helen Frances is told that Manners is dead.

Part Three introduces Orkhon Baatar, who helps the Airtons to survive. Lament of the previous tragedies. Finally, new character (Arthur Topps) enters Shishan.

== Reception ==
Critical reception for the book has been positive, and the work has received positive reviews from Publishers Weekly and Booklist. The Guardian commented that it was "A modern twist on the traditional historical epic, although at 700 pages, it does go on a bit."
