= Parque Marítimo César Manrique =

Coordinates: 28°27′15″N 16°15′18″W

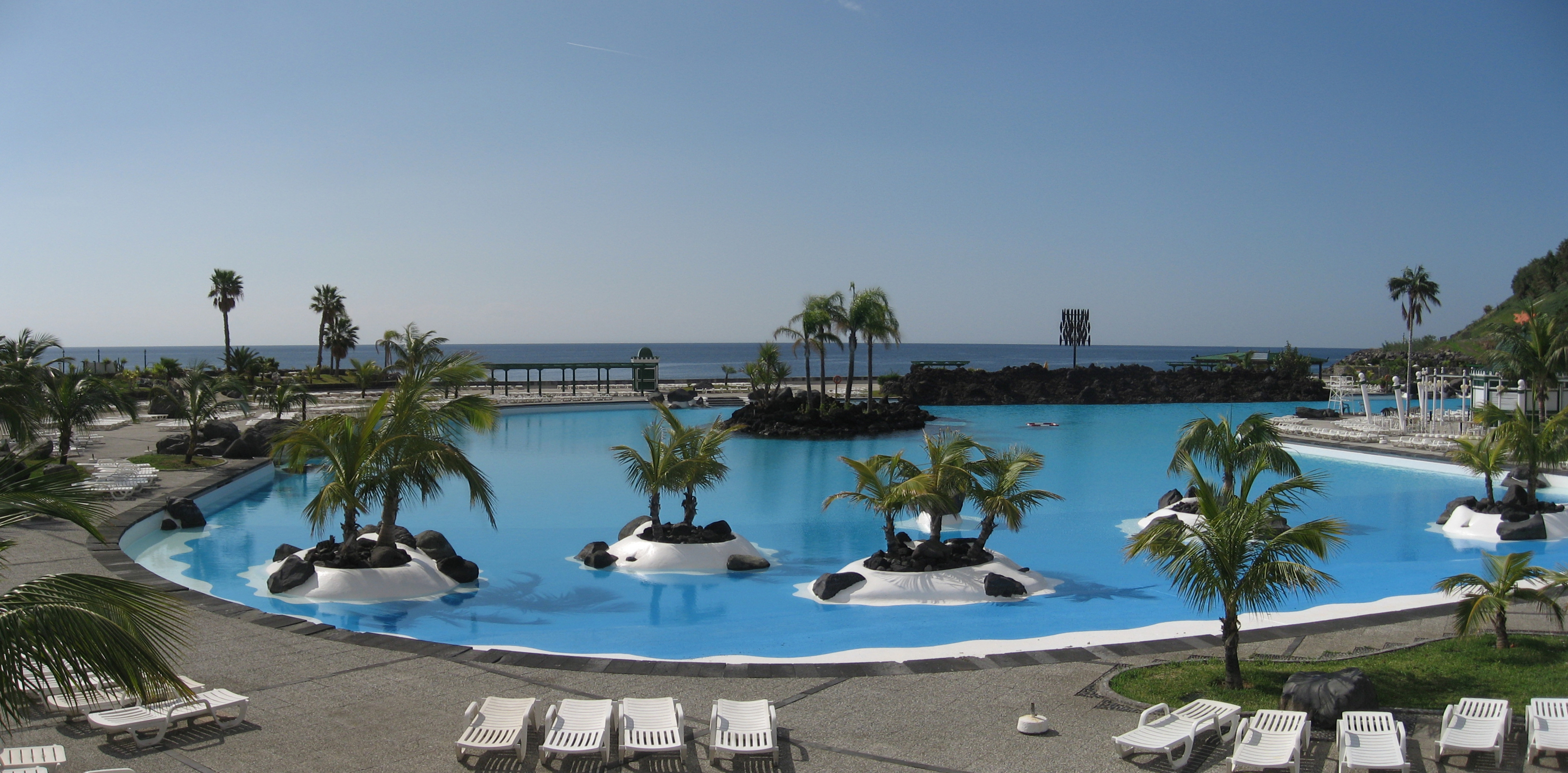
Parque Marítimo

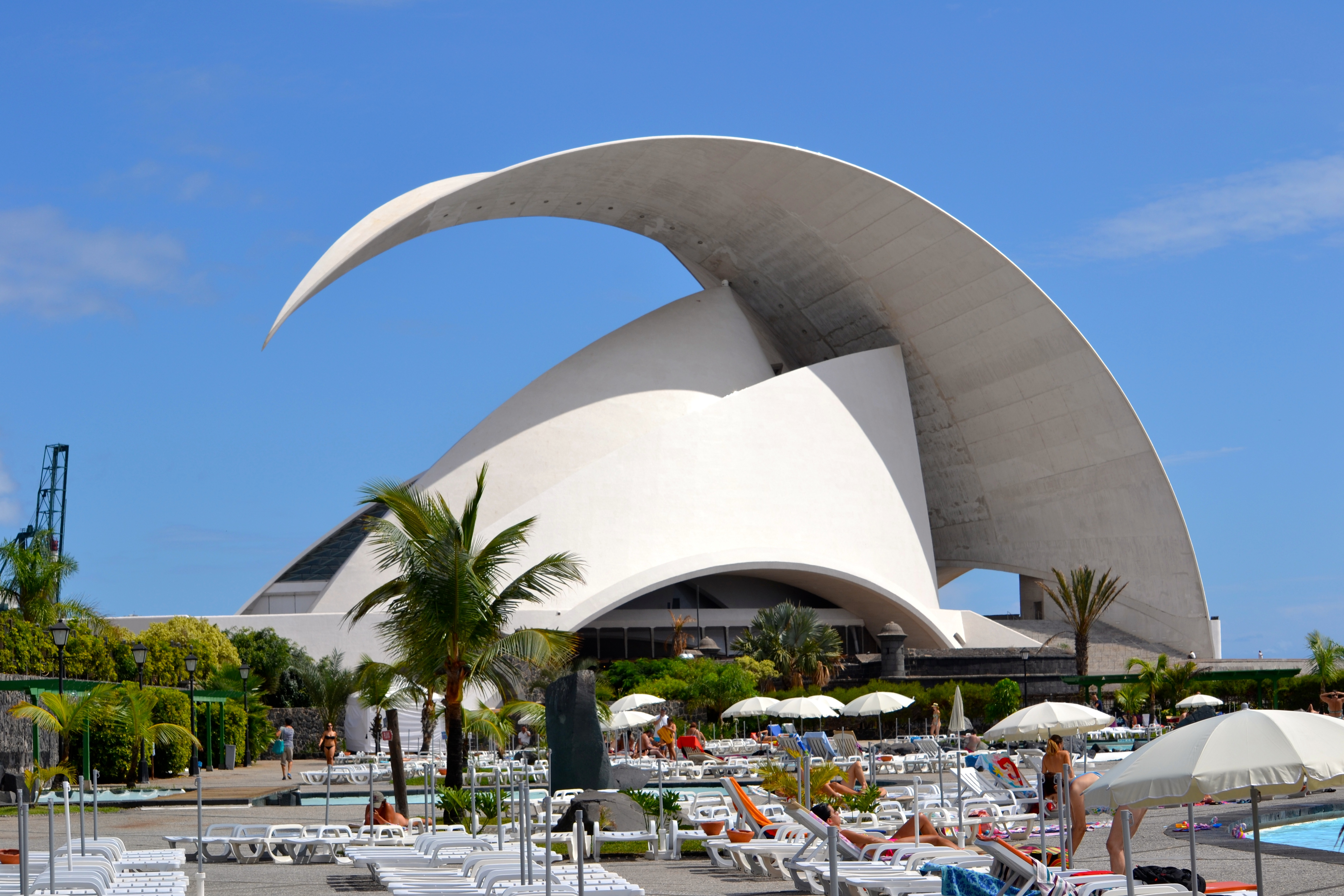
Parque Marítimo and Auditorio de Tenerife

The Parque Marítimo César Manrique is an entertainment complex, designed by architect César Manrique, located in the city of Santa Cruz de Tenerife (Tenerife, Spain).

The park is located in the current area of expansion of the capital of island, close to other buildings such as the Centro Internacional de Ferias y Congresos de Tenerife, the Auditorio de Tenerife, the Palmetum of Santa Cruz de Tenerife and the Torres de Santa Cruz. Direct access to the TF-1 motorway southbound and TF-5 northbound.

== Facilities ==
Parque Marítimo César Manrique covers 22,000 square meters and was inaugurated in 1995. The complex features elements of nature, such as volcanic rocks, palm trees and ornamental plants. These are the park's main facilities:

- Three pools (with water drawn from the sea)
- Artificial waterfall
- Restaurants
- Gym
- Games room
- Hot springs jacuzzi
- Children's play areas
- Sports facilities
- Small beach
