= Juvenilia =

Literary, musical or artistic works produced by an author during their youth

Juvenilia are literary, musical, or artistic works produced by authors during their youth. Written juvenilia, if published at all, usually appear as retrospective publications, some time after the author has become well known for later works.

The term's first recorded English use was in 1622 in George Wither's poetry collection Iuvenilia, but not without precedent: Ovid, in his Tristia, describes his early poems as carmina iuvenalia, for instance. Later, other notable poets, such as John Dryden and Alfred, Lord Tennyson, came to use the term for collections of their early poetry. The stories and poems that novelist Jane Austen wrote before the age of eighteen are called her Juvenilia.

Exceptions to retrospective publication include Leigh Hunt's collection Juvenilia, first published when he was still in his teens; and Lord Byron's publication of Fugitive Pieces when the author was only 17 years old, and his subsequent publication of Hours of Idleness at the age of 18.

== See also ==
- List of books written by children or teenagers
