= The Palace of Pleasure (poem) =

1801 poem by James Henry Leigh Hunt

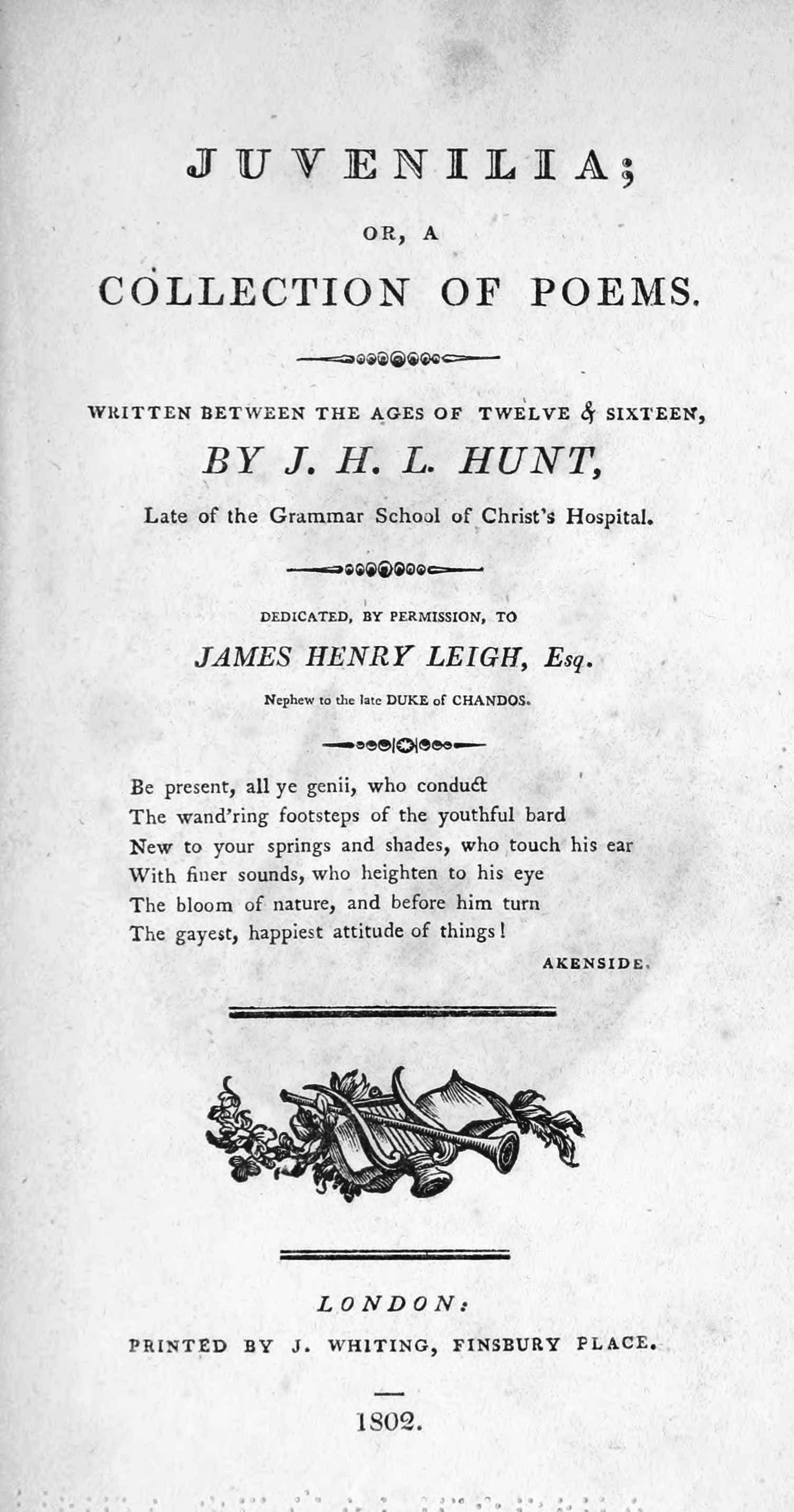
1802 title page

The Palace of Pleasure is a poem by James Henry Leigh Hunt published in his 1801 collection Juvenilia. Written before he was even sixteen, the work was part of a long tradition of poets imitating Spenser. The Palace of Pleasure is an allegory based on Book II of Edmund Spenser's The Faerie Queene and describes the adventure of Sir Guyon as he is taken by airy sylphs to the palace of the "Fairy Pleasure". According to Hunt the poem "endeavours to correct the vices of the age, by showing the frightful landscape that terminates the alluring path of sinful Pleasure".

== Background ==
After Hunt entered into a series of competitions run by the Monthly Preceptor calling for the submission at the age of 15, his father Isaac Hunt collected his son's childhood poetry to publish them. Among these was The Palace of Pleasure, which was printed by James Whiting in 1801 in Hunt's Juvenilia after his family managed to collect over 800 subscriptions for the volume. The Palace of Pleasure was the final work in the volume, which was reprinted four times before 1805. Attached to the beginning of the poem is a preface that shows Hunt discussing life in artistic and heroic terms, and he refers to himself when he describes "a Muse, who is entering into public in her sixteenth year, bashful on her first exhibition, and listening with trembling expectation, as she passes, to the shouts of disapprobation or applause that burst from the surrounding multitude."

== Poem ==
The poem is an allegory based on Edmund Spenser's The Faerie Queene Book II. The Palace of Pleasure describes the adventure of Sir Guyon as he is taken by airy sylphs to the palace of the "Fairy Pleasure". She is similar to Spenser's enchantress Arcasia, and, like Spenser's hero, Guyon is tested by an offer of pleasure by allegorical figures including Delicacy, Young Wantonness, and others. The Bacchian pleasure that they offer Guyon is revealed to be a sort of poison. As Guyon seeks to repent, he is attacked by creatures from hell and the allegorical figure connected to justice:

And next him started on the knight, I wot,
A most surprising fiend, whose visage pale
Was branded all about with dusky spot
Made by the fiery iron, heavy bale
To him that doth with impious hand assail
The laws of righteous Justice; and he hight
Foul Infamy, ay driv'n by Woe and Wail,
And pointing Scorn of moderation light,
And brazen-tongu'd Reproach, ne silent in the night. (lines 298–307)

Eventually, Guyon is saved by the allegorical character Content and her allies Temp'rance, Repentance, and others. They take him mountain where he is able to come back to his senses and continue on adventuring. In the final moments of the poem, it is Glory who gives him the encouragement to perform his political duty:

"Go," sun she, striking her exalted lyre,
"Go lift th' oppress'd, and beat th' oppressor low;
Go, where sad Justice sees her sons expire,
And Tyranny quaffs down the tears of Woe!
Eternal peace shall chear thy breast below,
And when Heav'n calls thee to its arms above,
Immortal splendour beam around thy brow!
Go; Virtue calls thee; watch her guiding eye;
When Virtue draws the sword, tempests and storms defy!" (lines 531–540)

== Themes ==
It is possible that Hunt derived his model of adapting Spenserian stanzas from James Thomson's use of them in The Castle of Indolence. In terms of Romantic poetry, Hunt's poem is related to the allegories found in Percy Bysshe Shelley's Queen Mab and The Revolt of Islam along with those in Robert Southey's Thalaba and Curse of Kehama. Hunt's Spenserian adaptation influenced John Keats's later use of Spenser as a model. However, Keats did not rely on the moral interpretation of spenser found in The Palace of Pleasure but instead on the side of Spenser emphasising the beautiful.

Of the works that imitate Spenser's use of the "Bower of Bliss" in Book II of the Faerie Queene, The Palace of Pleasure is connected to Southey's Romance and William Jones's Palace of Fortune. The only real difference between Hunt's and Spenser's version is the name of the tempter and that Hunt moved the setting from a Bower to a castle. Like Southey, the poem's allegory is focused more on political justice than morality. Hunt would later rely on the same Spenserian "Bower of Bliss" for the basis of a pleasure garden in The Story of Rimini written years later although he places more emphasis on the sexual aspects in the later work than on the meaning of the scene.

The poem, according to Hunt, "endeavours to correct the vices of the age, by showing the frightful landscape that terminates the alluring path of sinful Pleasure". In Guyon's story, many of the images connect to the description of Barbados. The land is a tropical paradise that tempts people with pleasure. This is biographically connected to Isaac Hunt's problems that come from his time in Barbados.
