= Meanings of minor-planet names: 16001–17000 =

As minor planet discoveries are confirmed, they are given a permanent number by the IAU's Minor Planet Center (MPC), and the discoverers can then submit names for them, following the IAU's naming conventions. The list below concerns those minor planets in the specified number-range that have received names, and explains the meanings of those names.

Official naming citations of newly named small Solar System bodies are approved and published in a bulletin by IAU's Working Group for Small Bodies Nomenclature (WGSBN). Before May 2021, citations were published in MPC's Minor Planet Circulars for many decades. Recent citations can also be found on the JPL Small-Body Database (SBDB). Until his death in 2016, German astronomer Lutz D. Schmadel compiled these citations into the Dictionary of Minor Planet Names (DMP) and regularly updated the collection.

Based on Paul Herget's The Names of the Minor Planets, Schmadel also researched the unclear origin of numerous asteroids, most of which had been named prior to World War II. This article incorporates text from this source, which is in the public domain: SBDB New namings may only be added to this list below after official publication as the preannouncement of names is condemned. The WGSBN publishes a comprehensive guideline for the naming rules of non-cometary small Solar System bodies.

== 16001–16100 ==
Named minor planet	Provisional	This minor planet was named for...	Ref; Catalog
16002 Bertin	1999 AM_{24}	Emmanuel Bertin (born 1973), French astronomer	JPL · 16002
16007 Kaasalainen	1999 BC_{11}	Mikko Kaasalainen (born 1965), Finnish astronomer and expert in orbital dynamics and lightcurve-inversion to reconstruct the shapes of minor planets	MPC · 16007
16012 Jamierubin	1999 CG_{19}	Jamie Elyce Rubin, 2003 Intel STS finalist	MPC · 16012
16013 Schmidgall	1999 CX_{38}	Emma Rose Schmidgall, 2003 Intel STS finalist	MPC · 16013
16014 Sinha	1999 CB_{47}	Naveen Neil Sinha, 2003 Intel STS finalist	MPC · 16014
16015 Snell	1999 CK_{47}	Sabrina Curie Snell, 2003 Intel STS finalist and USNO SEAP intern	MPC · 16015
16016 Boylan	1999 CB_{54}	Jack Boylan, 2019 Intel STS finalist	IAU · 16016
16017 Street	1999 CX_{65}	Ethan James Street, 2003 Intel STS finalist	MPC · 16017
16019 Edwardsu	1999 CL_{69}	Edward Joseph Su, 2003 Intel STS finalist	MPC · 16019
16020 Tevelde	1999 CA_{76}	Vera Louise te Velde, 2003 Intel STS finalist	MPC · 16020
16021 Caseyvaughn	1999 CG_{81}	Casey Ann Vaughn, 2003 Intel STS finalist	MPC · 16021
16022 Wissnergross	1999 CJ_{86}	Zachary Daniel Wissner-Gross, 2003 Intel STS finalist	MPC · 16022
16023 Alisonyee	1999 CV_{93}	Alison Kimberly Yee, 2003 Intel STS finalist	MPC · 16023
16026 Victoriapidgeon	1999 CM_{118}	Victoria Pidgeon Andrews (born 1956) did outstanding work for the NASA Planetary Defense Coordination Office. She guided the efforts of the US Government Interagency Working Group to develop the National Near Earth Object Preparedness Strategy and Action Plan to its publication on 2018 June 20.	IAU · 16026
16028 Anushree	1999 DC_{6}	Anushree Chaudhuri (b. 2002) was awarded second place in the 2019 Intel International Science and Engineering Fair for her chemistry project. She attended the Westview High School, San Diego, California, U.S.	IAU · 16028
16034 Prechoudhary	1999 FW_{32}	Prerit Choudhary, 2019 Intel STS finalist	IAU · 16034
16035 Sasandford	1999 FX_{32}	Scott A. Sandford (born 1957), American astronomer	MPC · 16035
16036 Moroz	1999 GV_{8}	Vassili I. Moroz (1931–2004), Russian planetary scientist and astronomer	MPC · 16036
16037 Sheehan	1999 GX_{8}	William Sheehan (born 1954), American psychiatrist, author, and amateur astronomer †	MPC · 16037
16039 Zeglin	1999 GH_{18}	Scott Bailey Zeglin, 2003 Intel STS finalist	MPC · 16039
16043 Yichenzhang	1999 GP_{23}	Yi-Chen Zhang, 2003 Intel STS finalist	MPC · 16043
16044 Kurtbachmann	1999 GW_{24}	Kurt Bachmann, 2003 Intel STS mentor	MPC · 16044
16046 Gregnorman	1999 JK	Greg Norman (born 1956), a professional golfer from Queensland, became the world's leading player several years running and was the winner of 86 tournaments, including two British opens. Nicknamed "The Shark", he is also a keen deep-sea fisherman.	MPC · 16046
16048 Eddiedai	1999 JU_{23}	Eddie Dai, 2019 Intel STS finalist	IAU · 16048
16049 D'Amore	1999 JS_{32}	Anthony Joseph D'Amore (born 2001), 2019 Intel ISEF finalist	MPC · 16049
16051 Bernero	1999 JF_{36}	Bruce Bernero, 2003 Intel STS mentor	MPC · 16051
16053 Brennan	1999 JA_{40}	James Brennan, 2003 Intel STS mentor	MPC · 16053
16055 Dellisanti	1999 JQ_{56}	Jack Delli-Santi, 2019 Intel STS finalist	IAU · 16055
16058 Doshi	1999 JP_{75}	Rajat Doshi, 2019 Intel STS finalist	IAU · 16058
16059 Marybuda	1999 JV_{86}	Mary Buda, 2003 Intel STS mentor	MPC · 16059
16060 Dahliadry	1999 JZ_{89}	Dahlia Dry, 2019 Intel STS finalist	IAU · 16060
16062 Buncher	1999 NR_{36}	David Buncher, 2003 Intel STS mentor	MPC · 16062
16064 Davidharvey	1999 RH_{27}	David Harvey (born 1958), a software engineer at the University of Arizona's Steward Observatory	JPL · 16064
16065 Borel	1999 RE_{35}	Émile Borel (1871–1956), French mathematician	MPC · 16065
16066 Richardbressler	1999 RN_{39}	Richard Main Bressler (born 1930), an American business leader and innovator, as well as a philanthropist, who has supported numerous worthy causes in science, education and the arts	JPL · 16066
16067 Brandonfan	1999 RA_{47}	Brandon Xu Fan, 2019 Intel STS finalist	IAU · 16067
16068 Citron	1999 RN_{86}	Jerry Citron, 2003 Intel STS mentor	MPC · 16068
16069 Marshafolger	1999 RS_{95}	Marsha Folger, 2003 Intel STS mentor	MPC · 16069
16070 Charops	1999 RB_{101}	Charops was a son of Hippasus, and brother to Socus. He was wounded by Odysseus in battle and defended by his brother.	IAU · 16070
16073 Gaskin	1999 RK_{129}	Regina Gaskin, 2003 Intel STS mentor	MPC · 16073
16074 Georgekaplan	1999 RR_{129}	George H. Kaplan (born 1948), American astronomer at USNO	MPC · 16074
16075 Meglass	1999 RL_{130}	Mary Elizabeth Glass, 2003 Intel STS mentor	MPC · 16075
16076 Barryhaase	1999 RV_{131}	Barry Haase, 2003 Intel STS mentor	MPC · 16076
16077 Arayhamilton	1999 RK_{157}	A. Ray Hamilton, 2003 Intel STS mentor	MPC · 16077
16078 Carolhersh	1999 RG_{177}	Carol Hersh, 2003 Intel STS mentor	MPC · 16078
16079 Imada	1999 RP_{181}	Keith Imada, 2003 Intel STS mentor	MPC · 16079
16080 Danielfeng	1999 RX_{184}	Daniel Feng, 2019 Intel STS finalist	IAU · 16080
16083 Jórvík	1999 TH_{12}	Jórvík, ninth-century Viking settlement that later became York †	MPC · 16083
16085 Laffan	1999 TM_{27}	John Laffan, 2003 Intel STS mentor	MPC · 16085
16087 Rhythmgarg	1999 TR_{102}	Rhythm Garg, 2019 Intel STS finalist	IAU · 16087
16088 Jessgoldstein	1999 TJ_{121}	Jessica Goldstein, 2019 Intel STS finalist	IAU · 16088
16089 Lamb	1999 TG_{147}	William Lamb, 2003 Intel STS mentor	MPC · 16089
16090 Lukaszewski	1999 TN_{147}	Angela Lukaszewski, 2003 Intel STS mentor	MPC · 16090
16091 Malchiodi	1999 TO_{152}	Beth Malchiodi, 2003 Intel STS mentor	MPC · 16091
16092 Anudeepgolla	1999 TP_{171}	Anudeep Golla (b. 2003) was awarded second place in the 2019 Intel International Science and Engineering Fair for his computational biology and bioinformatics project. He attended the Fairview High School, Boulder, Colorado, U.S.A	IAU · 16092
16094 Scottmccord	1999 TQ_{222}	Scott McCord, 2003 Intel STS mentor	MPC · 16094
16095 Lorenball	1999 TA_{249}	Loren C. Ball (born 1948), an American amateur astronomer and prolific discoverer of minor planets. Between 2000 and 2004, he discovered more than 100 asteroids from his Emerald Lane Observatory in Decatur, Alabama. Ball currently promotes asteroid education in schools and on social media.	JPL · 16095
16100 Hausknecht	1999 VO_{30}	Kaylie Hausknecht, 2019 Intel Science and Engineering Fair Winner	JPL · 16100

== 16101–16200 ==
back to top

Named minor planet	Provisional	This minor planet was named for...	Ref; Catalog
16101 Notskas	1999 VA_{36}	Chrysi Notskas, 2003 Intel STS mentor	MPC · 16101
16102 Barshannon	1999 VT_{68}	Barbara Shannon, 2003 Intel STS mentor	MPC · 16102
16103 Lorsolomon	1999 VU_{81}	Lorraine Solomon, 2003 Intel STS mentor	MPC · 16103
16104 Stesullivan	1999 VT_{177}	Stephen Sullivan, 2003 Intel STS mentor	MPC · 16104
16105 Marksaunders	1999 VL_{211}	Mark Saunders (born 1942), director of the Exploration Systems and Space Operations Technology Directorate at NASA Langley Research Center †	MPC · 16105
16106 Carmagnola	1999 VW_{212}	Carmagnola, Italy †	MPC · 16106
16107 Chanmugam	1999 WQ_{2}	Ganesar Chanmugam (1939–1996), Sri Lankan-born American astrophysicist	MPC · 16107
16110 Paganetti	1999 WU_{8}	Mariarosa Paganetti, mother of Swiss discoverer Stefano Sposetti	MPC · 16110
16111 Donstrittmatter	1999 XT_{4}	Donald J. Strittmatter (1935–2020) worked at Hughes Aircraft for 37 years retiring in 1994. He became President of the Tucson Amateur Astronomers in 1958 serving until 1976. In the late 1950s he was active in the Moonwatch program and known for photography of satellites and comets and teaching telescope making classes.	IAU · 16111
16112 Vitaris	1999 XK_{13}	Bethany Ann Vitaris, 2001 DCYSC finalist	MPC · 16112
16113 Ahmed	1999 XN_{23}	Tahir Ahmed, 2002 Intel STS finalist	MPC · 16113
16114 Alyono	1999 XV_{23}	Jennifer Christy Alyono, 2002 Intel STS finalist	MPC · 16114
16116 Balakrishnan	1999 XQ_{29}	Jennifer Sayaka Balakrishnan, 2002 Intel STS finalist	MPC · 16116
16117 Herbst	1999 XS_{29}	Hannah Herbst, 2019 Intel STS finalist	IAU · 16117
16118 Therberens	1999 XQ_{56}	Theresa Joan Berens, 2002 Intel STS finalist	MPC · 16118
16119 Bronner	1999 XS_{60}	Mordechai Joseph Bronner, 2002 Intel STS finalist	MPC · 16119
16120 Burnim	1999 XV_{60}	Jacob Samuels Burnim, 2002 Intel STS finalist	MPC · 16120
16121 Burrell	1999 XD_{66}	Marc Anthony Burrell, 2002 Intel STS finalist	MPC · 16121
16122 Wenyicai	1999 XW_{67}	Wenyi Cai, 2002 Intel STS finalist	MPC · 16122
16123 Jessiecheng	1999 XQ_{83}	Jessie Cheng, 2002 Intel STS finalist	MPC · 16123
16124 Timdong	1999 XR_{85}	Timothy Allen Dong, 2002 Intel STS finalist	MPC · 16124
16125 Carriehsu	1999 XK_{86}	Carrie Hsu, 2019 Intel STS finalist	IAU · 16125
16127 Farzan-Kashani	1999 XK_{92}	Raphael Farzan-Kashani, 2002 Intel STS	MPC · 16127
16128 Kirfrieda	1999 XS_{92}	Kirsten Linnea Frieda, 2002 Intel STS finalist	MPC · 16128
16129 Kevingao	1999 XG_{97}	Kevin Kuan Gao, 2002 Intel STS finalist	MPC · 16129
16130 Giovine	1999 XU_{97}	Allegra Elizabeth Giovine, 2002 Intel STS finalist	MPC · 16130
16131 Kaganovich	1999 XV_{97}	Mark Kaganovich, 2002 Intel STS	MPC · 16131
16132 Angelakim	1999 XH_{99}	Angela Soeun Kim, 2002 Intel STS finalist	MPC · 16132
16135 Ivarsson	1999 XY_{104}	Karl R. Ivarsson (born 1939), a vertical transportation specialist in Los Angeles for 37 years. JPL	MPC · 16135
16142 Leung	1999 XC_{135}	Albert W. Leung, 2002 Intel STS finalist	MPC · 16142
16144 Korsten	1999 XK_{144}	Erich E. Korsten (born 1945), a hydrologist and amateur astronomer from Dresden who now lives in Fountain Hills, Arizona.	JPL · 16144
16147 Jeanli	1999 XL_{175}	Jean Li, 2002 Intel STS finalist	MPC · 16147
16148 Amaraifeji	1999 XG_{188}	Amara Ifeji, 2019 Intel STS finalist	IAU · 16148
16150 Clinch	1999 XZ_{227}	Nicholas Bayard Clinch (born 1930), of Palo Alto, California, is a celebrated alpinist, expedition leader, philanthropist and investor.	JPL · 16150
16154 Dabramo	2000 AW_{2}	Germano D'Abramo (born 1973), Italian astronomer and discoverer of minor planets	MPC · 16154
16155 Buddy	2000 AF_{5}	Buddy Holly (1936–1959), was an American singer, songwriter, and pioneer of Rock and Roll from Lubbock, Texas, who was clearly the brightest star since Elvis when, at the age of 22, he was tragically killed in a plane crash. His life has been celebrated on film and in the long running musical Buddy. His songs remain as timeless as ever.	JPL · 16155
16157 Toastmasters	2000 AS_{50}	Toastmasters, a public speaking club, was started by Ralph C. Smedley in 1924 at a YMCA in Santa Ana, California. Today Toastmasters is an international organization that affords practice and training for men and women in the art of public speaking and in the presiding over meetings.	JPL · 16157
16158 Monty	2000 AV_{50}	Monty Roberts (born 1935), a true horse whisperer, has tirelessly taught that man-animal interactions, such as the traumatic breaking of horses, is bettered through nonviolent means. His writings extend these ideas and foster peaceable human-to-human interactions.	JPL · 16158
16163 Suhanli	2000 AD_{69}	Suhan Li, 2002 Intel STS finalist	MPC · 16163
16164 Yangli	2000 AO_{69}	Yang Li, 2002 Intel STS finalist	MPC · 16164
16165 Licht	2000 AW_{83}	Jacob Licht, 2002 Intel STS finalist	MPC · 16165
16166 Jonlii	2000 AQ_{84}	Jonathan Lii, 2002 Intel STS finalist	MPC · 16166
16167 Oertli	2000 AJ_{89}	Nicole Anne Oertli, 2002 Intel STS finalist	MPC · 16167
16168 Palmen	2000 AR_{91}	Brandon Michael Palmen, 2002 Intel STS finalist	MPC · 16168
16169 Janapaty	2000 AO_{95}	Shloka V. Janapaty, 2019 Intel STS finalist	IAU · 16169
16172 Jayaweera	2000 AZ_{97}	Milidu Jayaweera, 2019 Intel STS finalist	IAU · 16172
16174 Parihar	2000 AX_{116}	Raminder Kaur Parihar, 2002 Intel STS finalist	MPC · 16174
16175 Rypatterson	2000 AL_{118}	Ryan Randall Patterson, 2002 Intel STS	MPC · 16175
16177 Pelzer	2000 AR_{127}	Justin Raymond Pelzer, 2002 Intel STS	MPC · 16177
16179 Jeloka	2000 AL_{134}	Ritika Jeloka (b. 2002) was awarded second place in the 2019 Intel International Science and Engineering Fair for her cellular and molecular biology project. She attended the Melbourne High School, Melbourne, Florida, U.S.A.	IAU · 16179
16180 Rapoport	2000 AZ_{136}	Ezra Jacob Rapoport, 2002 Intel STS finalist	MPC · 16180
16185 Allisonjia	2000 AH_{164}	Allison Sihan Jia (b. 2002) was awarded best of category and first place in the 2019 Intel ISEF for her cellular and molecular biology project. She also received the Intel Foundation Young Scientist Award. She attended the Harker School, San Jose, California, U.S.A.	IAU · 16185
16186 Helenajiang	2000 AK_{164}	Helena Jiang (b. 2002) was awarded best of category and first place in the 2019 Intel International Science and Engineering Fair for her chemistry project. She attended the F. W. Buchholz High School, Gainesville, Florida, U.S.A.	IAU · 16186
16189 Riehl	2000 AT_{187}	Emily Elizabeth Riehl, 2002 Intel STS finalist	MPC · 16189
16190 Kabirjolly	2000 AK_{191}	Kabir Jolly (b. 2002) was awarded second place in the 2019 Intel International Science and Engineering Fair for his translational medical science project. He attended the College Park High School, The Woodlands, Texas, U.S.A.	IAU · 16190
16191 Rubyroe	2000 AO_{205}	Ruby Roe, first wife (1943–1997) of discoverer James M. Roe	MPC · 16191
16192 Laird	2000 AU_{207}	Elizabeth Rebecca Laird, Canadian physicist	JPL · 16192
16193 Nickaiser	2000 AV_{207}	Nicholas Kaiser (born 1954), a British astrophysicist, who studied at Leeds University and Cambridge University, was at the Canadian Institute for Theoretical Astrophysics from 1988 to 1997. Since then, he has been at the Institute for Astronomy in Hawaii. The name was suggested by P. Jedicke and R. Jedicke.	JPL · 16193
16194 Roderick	2000 AJ_{231}	Gavin Roderick (1977–2001) was an exceptionally bright and enthusiastic student of astrophysics at Cardiff University who died before being able to complete his studies and embark on a career in astronomy. He is greatly missed by his loving family, by his many friends and by all who taught him.	MPC · 16194
16197 Bluepeter	2000 AA_{243}	After the long-running children's programme Blue Peter on BBC television	MPC · 16197
16198 Búzios	2000 AB_{243}	Armação dos Búzios, Rio de Janeiro State, Brazil	JPL · 16198
16199 Rozenblyum	2000 BX_{26}	Nikita Rozenblyum, 2002 Intel STS finalist	MPC · 16199

== 16201–16300 ==
back to top

Named minor planet	Provisional	This minor planet was named for...	Ref; Catalog
16202 Srivastava	2000 CE_{28}	Siddharth Srivastava, 2002 Intel STS finalist	JPL · 16202
16203 Jessicastahl	2000 CH_{32}	Jessica Randi Stahl, 2002 Intel STS finalist	JPL · 16203
16207 Montgomery	2000 CV_{40}	Michael Montgomery (1925–2011) was a well-known jazz and ragtime piano player in the Detroit area of Michigan, and had one of the largest private collections of antique piano rolls in the U.S.	JPL · 16207
16209 Sterner	2000 CB_{56}	Beckett William Sterner, 2002 Intel STS finalist	JPL · 16209
16211 Samirsur	2000 CL_{83}	Samir Sur, 2002 Intel STS finalist	JPL · 16211
16212 Theberge	2000 CB_{84}	Ashleigh Brooks Theberge, 2002 Intel STS finalist	JPL · 16212
16214 Venkatachalam	2000 CM_{87}	Vivek Venkatachalam, 2002 Intel STS finalist	JPL · 16214
16215 Venkatraman	2000 CB_{104}	Dheera Venkatraman, 2002 Intel STS finalist	JPL · 16215
16217 Peterbroughton	2000 DR_{13}	Peter Broughton (born 1940) taught high-school mathematics in Toronto, Ontario. He is an amateur astronomer who served as president of the Royal Astronomical Society of Canada and received the society's Service Award in 1987. The name was suggested by P. Jedicke and R. Jedicke.	JPL · 16217
16218 Mintakeyes	2000 DV_{14}	Minta Keys (born 1961) is a veterinarian in Tucson, Arizona, who provides preventive, diagnostic and therapeutic care to cats. She is also on the Board of Directors of the Tucson Hermitage Cat Shelter.	JPL · 16218
16219 Venturelli	2000 DL_{29}	Ophelia Shalini Venturelli, 2002 Intel STS finalist	JPL · 16219
16220 Mikewagner	2000 DB_{40}	Michael Jacob Wagner, 2002 Intel STS finalist	JPL · 16220
16221 Kevinyang	2000 DX_{48}	Kevin Yang, 2002 Intel STS finalist	JPL · 16221
16222 Donnanderson	2000 DK_{55}	Donna Anderson, 2002 Intel STS mentor	JPL · 16222
16223 Racheljoseph	2000 DR_{69}	Rachel Joseph (b. 2001) was awarded second place in the 2019 Intel International Science and Engineering Fair for her environmental engineering project. She attended the Somers High School, Lincolndale, New York, U.S.A.	IAU · 16223
16225 Georgebaldo	2000 DF_{71}	George J. Baldo, 2002 Intel STS mentor	JPL · 16225
16226 Beaton	2000 DT_{72}	John Beaton, 2002 Intel STS mentor	JPL · 16226
16227 Emilykang	2000 DY_{73}	Emily K. Kang (b. 2003) was awarded second place in the 2019 Intel International Science and Engineering Fair for her microbiology project. She attended the Canyon Crest Academy, San Diego, California, U.S.A.	IAU · 16227
16228 Adhamkassem	2000 EC_{39}	Adham Mohab Kassem (b. 2000) was awarded first place in the 2019 Intel International Science and Engineering Fair for his plant sciences project. He attended the College Park High School, The Woodlands, Texas, U.S.A.	IAU · 16228
16229 Kavyakoneru	2000 EM_{46}	Kavya Sai Koneru (b. 2002) was awarded second place in the 2019 Intel International Science and Engineering Fair for her biochemistry team project. She attended the duPont Manual High School, Louisville, Kentucky, U.S.A.	IAU · 16229
16230 Benson	2000 EA_{95}	Carol Benson, 2002 Intel STS mentor	JPL · 16230
16231 Jessberger	2000 ES_{130}	Elmar K. Jessberger (born 1943) is a German professor of experimental and analytical planetology and director of the Institute for Planetology at the Westfälischen Wilhelms-University in Münster. He is renowned for his work on lunar and meteorite chronology and microanalysis of cosmic dust.	JPL · 16231
16232 Chijagerbs	2000 ED_{152}	James "Gerbs" Bauer (born 1968) is a planetary scientist and a discoverer of minor planets at the Jet Propulsion Laboratory whose research focuses on the physical nature of outer Solar System bodies. Chija Bauer (born 1977) is a physics teacher who helps to develop future scientists.	JPL · 16232
16234 Bosse	2000 FR_{20}	Angelique Bosse, 2002 Intel STS mentor	JPL · 16234
16236 Stebrehmer	2000 GG_{51}	Steven Brehmer, 2002 Intel STS mentor. He is a teacher at the Mayo High School, Rochester, Minnesota.	JPL · 16236
16237 Emmakratcha	2000 GX_{76}	Emma Pearl Kratcha (b. 2003) was awarded second place in the 2019 Intel International Science and Engineering Fair for her plant sciences project. She attended the Hankinson Public School, Hankinson, North Dakota, U.S.A.	IAU · 16237
16238 Chappe	2000 GY_{104}	Sean Chappe, 2002 Intel STS mentor	JPL · 16238
16239 Dower	2000 GY_{105}	Richard Dower, 2002 Intel STS mentor	JPL · 16239
16241 Dvorsky	2000 GD_{126}	Mary Ann Dvorsky, 2002 Intel STS mentor. Dvorsky is a teacher at the Montgomery Blair High School, Silver Spring, Maryland.	JPL · 16241
16242 Licato	2000 GT_{126}	James Licato (b. 2003) was awarded second place in the 2019 Intel International Science and Engineering Fair for his earth and environmental sciences project. He attended the Washington-Lee High School, Arlington, Virginia, U.S.A.	IAU · 16242
16243 Rosenbauer	2000 GO_{147}	Helmut Rosenbauer (born 1936), German astronomer and director of the Max Planck Institute for Aeronomy in Katlenburg-Lindau. He was a leader in promoting the Philae lander on the Rosetta spacecraft to comet 67P/Churyumov-Gerasimenko. Rosenbauer is PI of the COSAC instrument, designed to measure the comet's surface chemistry.	JPL · 16243
16244 Brož	2000 GQ_{147}	Miroslav Brož (born 1975), a Czech celestial mechanician at Charles University, Prague. Brož specializes in numerical methods and the Yarkovsky effect, and he also teaches at The Observatory and Planetarium Hradec Králové.	JPL · 16244
16245 Katielu	2000 GM_{160}	Katie Lu (b. 2001) was awarded best of category and first place in the 2019 Intel International Science and Engineering Fair for her earth and environmental sciences project. She attended the Central High School, Springfield, Missouri, U.S.A.	IAU · 16245
16246 Cantor	2000 HO_{3}	Georg Cantor (1845–1918), a Russian-born German mathematician and professor at Halle. In a series of papers beginning in 1870 he developed the theory of infinite sets and was the first to recognize and prove that there are different degrees of infinity.	JPL · 16246
16247 Esner	2000 HY_{11}	William Esner, 2002 Intel STS mentor	JPL · 16247
16248 Fox	2000 HT_{13}	Mitchell Fox, 2002 Intel STS mentor	JPL · 16248
16249 Cauchy	2000 HT_{14}	Augustin-Louis Cauchy (1789–1857), a French mathematician who made fundamental contributions to the theory of functions of complex variables, the study of determinants and the mathematical theory of elasticity. He introduced a higher level of rigor in mathematical proofs.	MPC · 16249
16250 Delbó	2000 HP_{26}	Marco Delbó (born 1972), an Italian astronomer who has contributed to the knowledge of the physical properties of near-Earth asteroids by means of thermal-infrared observations and modeling. He has derived an estimate of the thermal inertia of near-earth asteroids, which is vital for reliable calculations of orbital drift due to the Yarkovsky effect.	JPL · 16250
16251 Barbifrank	2000 HX_{48}	Barbi Frank, 2002 Intel STS mentor	JPL · 16251
16252 Franfrost	2000 HQ_{51}	Fran Frost, 2002 Intel STS mentor	JPL · 16252
16253 Griffis	2000 HJ_{52}	Wanda Griffis, 2002 Intel STS mentor	JPL · 16253
16254 Harper	2000 HZ_{53}	Dan Harper, 2002 Intel STS mentor	JPL · 16254
16255 Hampton	2000 HX_{63}	Donald L. Hampton (born 1963), an atmospheric physicist at Ball Aerospace and Technology, has served as the system engineer for all the scientific instruments on the Deep Impact mission.	JPL · 16255
16258 Willhayes	2000 JP_{13}	William Hayes, 2002 Intel STS mentor	JPL · 16258
16259 Housinger	2000 JR_{13}	Sharon Housinger, 2002 Intel STS mentor	JPL · 16259
16260 Sputnik	2000 JO_{15}	Sputnik is the Russian name of a series of artificial satellites, the first of which ushered in the space age on 1957 Oct. 4.	JPL · 16260
16261 Iidemachi	2000 JF_{18}	Iidemachi, a town is situated in the southern part of Yamagata, Japan.	JPL · 16261
16262 Rikurtz	2000 JR_{32}	Richard Kurtz, 2002 Intel STS mentor	JPL · 16262
16264 Richlee	2000 JH_{40}	Richard Lee, 2002 Intel STS mentor	JPL · 16264
16265 Lemay	2000 JL_{43}	Ron LeMay, 2002 Intel STS mentor	JPL · 16265
16266 Johconnell	2000 JX_{43}	John McConnell, 2002 Intel STS mentor	JPL · 16266
16267 Mcdermott	2000 JY_{43}	Frank McDermott, 2002 Intel STS mentor	JPL · 16267
16268 Mcneeley	2000 JD_{44}	Pam McNeeley, 2002 Intel STS mentor	JPL · 16268
16269 Merkord	2000 JP_{44}	Pat Merkord, 2002 Intel STS mentor	JPL · 16269
16271 Duanenichols	2000 JC_{55}	Duane Nichols, 2002 Intel STS mentor	JPL · 16271
16273 Oneill	2000 JS_{56}	Barbara O'Neill, 2002 Intel STS mentor	JPL · 16273
16274 Pavlica	2000 JX_{56}	Robert Pavlica, 2002 Intel STS mentor	JPL · 16274
16275 Charlesma	2000 JP_{58}	Charles Ma (b. 2002) was awarded second place in the 2019 Intel International Science and Engineering Fair for his biomedical engineering team project. He attended the Montgomery High School, Skillman , New Jersey, U.S.A.	IAU · 16275
16276 Virginiama	2000 JX_{61}	Virginia Ma (b. 2001) was awarded second place in the 2019 Intel International Science and Engineering Fair for her computational biology and bioinformatics project. She attended the Columbus Academy, Gahanna, Ohio, U.S.A.	IAU · 16276
16277 Mallada	2000 JW_{74}	Esmeralda Mallada (born 1937), an Uruguayan astronomer and professor at the Universidad de la República, who studies minor bodies and teaches cosmography and mathematics. In 1952 she was one of the founders of the Asociación de Aficionados a la Astronomía, the oldest amateur astronomer association in Uruguay.	JPL · 16277
16280 Groussin	2000 LS_{6}	Olivier Groussin (born 1976), an American planetary scientist at the University of Maryland, played a major role in the calibration of the visible-light instruments on the Deep Impact mission, and he also developed models for interpreting the results from the infrared spectrometer.	JPL · 16280

== 16301–16400 ==
back to top

Named minor planet	Provisional	This minor planet was named for...	Ref; Catalog
16319 Xiamenerzhong	3252 T-1	Named for the Xiamen No. 2 Middle School of Fujian, China, which has cultivated thousands of successful people in all walks of life since 1870, incorporating football, English, and music into school education. Name suggested by D.-h. Chen, a student of the school during 1961–1967.	JPL · 16319
16355 Buber	1975 UA_{1}	Martin Buber (1878–1965), an Austrian-born Jewish philosopher and author.	JPL · 16355
16356 Univbalttech	1976 GV_{2}	Балтийского государственного технического университета «Военмех» (Voenmekh Baltic State Technical University, BSTU), St. Petersburg, Russia (previously the Leningrad Institute of Mechanics)	JPL · 16356
16357 Risanpei	1976 UP_{18}	Ri Sanpei (died 1655), (Li Sam Pyung in Korean) was one of the potters who was taken from the north-west Korean Peninsula to the north-west of Kyushu Island in 1598	JPL · 16357
16358 Plesetsk	1976 YN_{7}	Plesetsk Cosmodrome, main launching site of the former Soviet Union	JPL · 16358
16367 Astronomiasvecia	1980 FS_{4}	The name celebrates the 2019 centenary of the Swedish Astronomical Society (Svenska astronomiska sällskapet), which was founded in 1919.	IAU · 16367
16368 Città di Alba	1981 DF	Alba is an ancient town, capital of the historical region of Langhe in Piedmont. It is famous for the excellence of its gastronomy, including "tartufi", sweets and some of the best Italian wines. The Cittá di Alba was a partisan stronghold during World War II and is very active now in cultural activities	JPL · 16368
16372 Demichele	1981 EP_{1}	Vincenzo De Michele (born 1936) is an Italian mineralogist and gemologist. He was the author of important works of mineralogical dissemination, including the Mineralogical Guide of Italy, and numerous essays on systematic and regional mineralogy. He was the discoverer of the Kamil impact crater (Egypt).	JPL · 16372
16395 Ioannpravednyj	1981 US_{14}	Ioannpravednyj (pious St. Ioann Kronstadtskij; Ivan Il'ich Sergiev, 1829–1908) was an archpriest who served in the cathedral of Kotlin island in the Gulf of Finland. He became famous for miraculous healing, generous charity and a pious life. He established a center to help unemployed and homeless people, the first in Russia	JPL · 16395
16397 Carlahayden	1982 JS_{2}	Carla Hayden (born 1951), 14th librarian of Congress.	JPL · 16397
16398 Hummel	1982 SN_{3}	Johann Nepomuk Hummel (1778–1837), famous Austrian pianist and versatile composer.	JPL · 16398
16399 Grokhovsky	1983 RF_{2}	Victor Grokhovsky (born 1947), a professor of meteoritics at the Ural Federal University in Yekaterinburg, Russia.	JPL · 16399

== 16401–16500 ==
back to top

Named minor planet	Provisional	This minor planet was named for...	Ref; Catalog
16402 Olgapopova	1984 UR	Olga P. Popova (born 1963), an expert in meteoroid strengths at the Institute for Dynamics of Geospheres of the Russian Academy of Sciences.	JPL · 16402
16405 Testudo	1985 DA_{2}	Testudo, the name of the mascot of the University of Maryland (UMD).	IAU · 16405
16406 Oszkiewicz	1985 PH	Dagmara Oszkiewicz (born 1982), a postdoctoral researcher at the Adam Mickiewicz University in Poznań, Poland.	JPL · 16406
16407 Oiunskij	1985 SV_{2}	Platon Alekseevich Sleptsov-Oiunskij (1893–1939) was a prominent Yakut writer, philosopher, scientist and public figure who had an influence on developing the national identity, science, language, literature and spiritual culture in Yakutia.	JPL · 16407
16413 Abulghazi	1987 BA_{2}	Abu al-Ghazi Bahadur (1603–1663) ruled the khanate of Khorezm (now Uzbekistan). A copy of his writings on Mongols and Tatars fell into the hands of German naturalist D. G. Messerschmidt during a Siberian voyage and was published as Histoire généralogique des Tatars (Leiden, 1726).	JPL · 16413
16414 Le Procope	1987 QO_{5}	Hermann Goldschmidt (1802–1866), a German painter and amateur astronomer, discovered 14 new minor planets during 1852–1861 from his living room above Le Procope café in Paris. The café, apparently the oldest in Paris, was established by Francesco Procopio in 1686	JPL · 16414
16418 Lortzing	1987 SD_{10}	Albert Lortzing (1801–1851), was a German singer, an actor and later a conductor.	JPL · 16418
16419 Kovalev	1987 SS_{28}	Sergej Nikitich Kovalev (born 1919) is an outstanding shipbuilder and prominent expert in the field of mechanics and hydrodynamics of ships and energetics. He is also broadly known for his paintings and literary works	JPL · 16419
16421 Roadrunner	1988 BJ	Roadrunner is the common name for the Californian Earthcuckoo (Geococcyx californianus). The name comes from the habit of the bird of racing down roads in front of fast-moving vehicles	JPL · 16421
16424 Davaine	1988 CD_{2}	Casimir Davaine (1812–1882) was a French physician working in the field of microbiology. In 1850 he discovered, with the pathologist Oliver Rayer, the microorganism Bacillus anthracis in the blood of diseased and dying sheep. The microorganism had the property of transmission from one animal to another.	JPL · 16424
16425 Chuckyeager	1988 CY_{2}	Chuck Yeager (1923–2020) was the first pilot confirmed to have broken the sound barrier in level flight, piloting a Bell XS-1 aircraft, on the morning of October 14, 1947.	JPL · 16425
16435 Fándly	1988 VE_{7}	Juraj Fándly (1750–1811) a Slovak Roman Catholic priest, writer and author of the first book in Bernolák's language Dúverná zmlúva mezi mňí chom a diáblom ("The confidential pact between the monk and the devil", 1789). He was a zealous propagator of this language and a well-known educator.	JPL · 16435
16438 Knöfel	1989 AU_{6}	André Knöfel (born 1963), a German meteorologist, amateur astronomer and an observer of minor planets, who is the head of the Fireball Data Center of the International Meteor Organization. He has located precovery observations of many objects in the Digital Sky Survey, among them this minor planet and the trans-Neptunian object 20000 Varuna.	MPC · 16438
16439 Yamehoshinokawa	1989 BZ	Yamehoshinokawa, Japanese river	JPL · 16439
16441 Kirchner	1989 EF_{6}	Ernst Ludwig Kirchner (1880–1938), a German painter, graphic artist and sculptor.	JPL · 16441
16444 Godefroy	1989 GW_{1}	Godefroy Wendelin (1580–1660) was a Belgian canon of the Liège episcopacy and an astronomer who erected the first astronomical observatory at the Signal de Lure near Mont Ventoux in Provence. The name was suggested by F. M. van der Mersch	JPL · 16444
16445 Klimt	1989 GN_{3}	Gustav Klimt (1862–1918), an Austrian painter and one of the most prominent members of the Vienna Art Nouveau movement. His paintings, characterized by elegant gold and colorful ornamentation, express subtle erotic feelings, as in "Die Jungfrau" (1907) and "Dana" (1913).	JPL · 16445
16447 Vauban	1989 RX	Sébastien Le Prestre de Vauban (1633–1707), a French marshal and strategist of genius	JPL · 16447
16449 Kigoyama	1989 SO	Mount Kigoyama (546 m), Iahikawa prefecture, Japan, at whose summit are a planetarium and public observatory	JPL · 16449
16450 Messerschmidt	1989 SY_{2}	Daniel Gottlieb Messerschmidt (1685–1735), a German naturalist who was sent by Peter the Great on an expedition to Siberia during 1719–1728. The first person to study systematically the "rumors" about "frozen" mammoths, he investigated thoroughly Siberian fauna and flora, as well as its mineralogy and geography.	JPL · 16450
16452 Goldfinger	1989 SE_{8}	Pauline J. ("PJ") Goldfinger, American adaptive-optics operator, who assisted in organizing the photographic glass plate archive of the 1.2-m Schmidt Oschin Telescope at Palomar Observatory	JPL · 16452
16459 Barth	1989 WE_{4}	Karl Barth (1886–1968), a Swiss Protestant Reformed theologian and professor in Basel beginning in 1935. In Germany, he is known as the "Vater der Bekennende Kirche" where he was ousted from his post. His main works are "The Epistle to the Romans" and "Ecclesiastical Dogmatics".	JPL · 16459
16463 Nayoro	1990 EK	Nayoro, Hokkaido, Japan	JPL · 16463
16465 Basilrowe	1990 FV_{1}	Basil H. Rowe (born 1960), a founding member of and current president of the Friends of the Cincinnati Observatory.	JPL · 16465
16466 Piyashiriyama	1990 FJ_{2}	Mount Piyashiri (Piyashiri Yama), Hokkaido, Japan	JPL · 16466
16479 Paulze	1990 QK_{7}	Marie-Anne Paulze Lavoisier (1758–1836), wife and scientific collaborator of French chemist Antoine Lavoisier	JPL · 16479
16481 Thames	1990 QU_{7}	The Thames, with a length of nearly 350 km, is the chief river in southern England.	JPL · 16481
16494 Oka	1990 SP_{8}	Oka River, flowing from the central Russian Upland to eventually join the Volga	JPL · 16494
16497 Toinevermeylen	1990 SU_{8}	Antoine (Toine) Vermeylen (1937–2012) was a good friend of the discoverer.	JPL · 16497
16498 Passau	1990 SX_{8}	The Bavarian town of Passau in Germany	JPL · 16498

== 16501–16600 ==
back to top

Named minor planet	Provisional	This minor planet was named for...	Ref; Catalog
16503 Ayato	1990 TY	Ayato Seki (born 2005), a grandchild of Japanese discoverer Tsutomu Seki	JPL · 16503
16505 Sulzer	1990 TB_{13}	Robert Sulzer-Forrer (1873–1953), a Swiss industrialist from Winterthur and member of the Sulzer dynasty	MPC · 16505
16507 Fuuren	1990 UM_{2}	The Japanese town of Fūren, Hokkaido. It is known for its fine rice.	JPL · 16507
16513 Vasks	1990 VP_{6}	Pēteris Vasks (born 1946), Latvian composer and contra-bassist	JPL · 16513
16514 Stevelia	1990 VZ_{6}	Steve Goldberg (born 1949) and Amelia Goldberg (born 1940). They have spent years teaching beginners to observe the night sky. Amelia's Universe Sampler, a booklet of simple projects for beginners with small telescopes, is an official project of the Astronomical League. The couple has also helped manage the annual Texas Star Party	JPL · 16514
16515 Usmanʹgrad	1990 VN_{14}	The town of Usmanʹ, Russia. It was founded in 1645, and is the birthplace of: physicist and Nobel Prize winner Nikolay Basov (1922–2001), astronomer and discoverer of minor planets Nikolai Chernykh (1931–2004) and the ethnographer B. P. Knyazhinskij (1892–1975).	JPL · 16515
16516 Efremlevitan	1990 VR_{14}	Efrem Pavlovich Levitan (born 1934) is a Russian teacher, scientist, writer, journalist and the deputy editor-in-chief of the magazine The Earth and the Universe. For 55 years he has popularized astronomy in books, papers and lectures.	JPL · 16516
16518 Akihikoito	1990 WF	Akihiko Ito (born 1959) is one of the leading CCD astrophotographers in Japan. He has shared his knowledge and skill with others from around the world who are interested in this field and contributed to great improvements in CCD imaging	JPL · 16518
16522 Tell	1991 AJ_{3}	William Tell, legendary folk hero of Switzerland	JPL · 16522
16524 Hausmann	1991 BB_{3}	Manfred Hausmann (1898–1986), who was born in Kassel and died in Bremen, lived for many years in Worpswede and wrote lyrical poetry, stories and novels. Widely traveled, he studied distant cultures and translated their works. After 1945 he turned to Christianity and became a preacher	JPL · 16524
16525 Shumarinaiko	1991 CU_{2}	Lake Shumarinai, located in the Shumarinai Prefectural Natural Park, Hokkaido, Japan	JPL · 16525
16528 Terakado	1991 GV	Kazuo Terakado (born 1947), Japanese scientific journalist and author	JPL · 16528
16529 Dangoldin	1991 GO_{1}	Dan Goldin (born 1940), American NASA administrator	MPC · 16529
16543 Rosetta	1991 RC_{2}	The Rosetta space probe, which successfully visited comet 67P/Churyumov–Gerasimenko in 2014	JPL · 16543
16544 Hochlehnert	1991 RA_{3}	Horst Hochlehnert (born 1944) is a well-known German radiologist, radio ham operator and a good friend of the first discoverer.	JPL · 16544
16552 Sawamura	1991 SB	Tsuneo Sawamura (born 1928), a Japanese inventor. His anti-corrosion solder was used for the electrical systems of the Space Shuttle.	JPL · 16552
16555 Nagaomasami	1991 US_{3}	Masami Nagao (1966–1984), Japanese amateur astronomer	JPL · 16555
16560 Daitor	1991 VZ_{5}	Daitor, a Trojan warrior who was killed by Teucer (Teukros) in Greek mythology	JPL · 16560
16561 Rawls	1991 VP_{7}	John Rawls (1921–2002), American moral and political philosopher, known for his book A Theory of Justice	MPC · 16561
16563 Ob	1992 BF_{2}	Ob River, flowing from the Altai Mountains to eventually join the Irtish, on which Joseph-Nicolas Delisle traveled in April 1740 to observe a transit of Mercury	JPL · 16563
16564 Coriolis	1992 BK_{2}	Gaspard-Gustave de Coriolis (1792–1843), French mathematician, mechanical engineer and scientist	MPC · 16564
16578 Essjayess	1992 FM_{1}	Shirley June Steel (S. J. S., pronounced: "Ess Jay Ess", née Parsons), mother of British discoverer Duncan Steel	JPL · 16578
16583 Oersted	1992 OH_{2}	Hans Christian Ørsted (1777–1851), a Danish physicist and chemist.	JPL · 16583
16587 Nagamori	1992 SE	Kyouji Nagamori (born 1932), Japanese planetary ephemeride calculator	JPL · 16587
16588 Johngee	1992 ST	John Gee (?), who has provided leadership and service to the Caltech Class of 1953 and the Caltech community for more than half a century, including a stint as president of the Alumni Association	JPL · 16588
16589 Hastrup	1992 SL_{1}	Rolf Hastrup (born 1930), who was involved with NASA's Surveyor and Viking programs. He continues his long career at Caltech's Jet Propulsion Laboratory, planning future uncrewed space missions. He is a classmate of the discoverer's husband (Caltech class of 1953) and long time friend	JPL · 16589
16590 Brunowalter	1992 SM_{2}	Bruno Walter (1876–1962), German-American conductor and composer	MPC · 16590
16594 Sorachi	1992 UL_{4}	Sorachi District, Hokkaido, Japan	JPL · 16594
16596 Stephenstrauss	1992 UN_{7}	Steven Strauss (born 1943), science writer at the Canadian Toronto The Globe and Mail who received the Connaught medal in 1995	MPC · 16596
16598 Brugmansia	1992 YC_{2}	Brugmansia, known as "angel's trumpets", a genus of flowering plants in the family Solanaceae. They are woody trees or shrubs, with pendulous flowers, and have no spines on their fruit.	JPL · 16598
16599 Shorland	1993 BR_{2}	John Herschel Shorland, a direct descendant of John Herschel, has recently completed his own Herschel Archives in Norfolk, England. These archives include various documents and instruments associated with the Herschels, including the 7-foot telescope probably used by William Herschel to discover Uranus	JPL · 16599

== 16601–16700 ==
back to top

Named minor planet	Provisional	This minor planet was named for...	Ref; Catalog
16602 Anabuki	1993 FY_{3}	Katsuhiko Anabuki (born 1955) was born in Marugame City, Kagawa prefecture. While running a printing business, he is active as an amateur astronomer, a member of Shikoku Astronomical Society and dedicated to astrophotography	JPL · 16602
16623 Muenzel	1993 GM_{1}	Gisela Muenzel was the life partner of Hilmar W. Duerbeck. Over the last 20 years, she contributed various papers on the history of astronomy, and collaborated with Duerbeck on diverse historical archives of astronomers and observatories	JPL · 16623
16624 Hoshizawa	1993 HX	Sachiko Hoshizawa (born 1951), a Japanese cook, television personality, and space enthusiast. He appears daily on a Japanese television program about cooking and has introduced more than 3800 dishes using the produce of Hokkaido. A great space enthusiast, she developed and in 2000 presented to the astronaut Kouichi Wakata a special soybean soup for space.	JPL · 16624
16625 Kunitsugu	1993 HG_{1}	Kunitsugu Terakado, Japanese project leader at the National Space Development Agency (NASDA)	JPL · 16625
16626 Thumper	1993 HJ_{3}	Thumper, fictional young rabbit in Walt Disney's 1942 animated film Bambi	JPL · 16626
16641 Esteban	1993 QH_{10}	Manuel (born 1940) and Gloria (born 1940) Esteban have been an admired and popular couple at the California State University, Chico, where he served very ably as president from 1993 to 2003. Both Barcelona-born, Manuel is also known for his ability as an artistic glassblower and Gloria for her interest in art and literature.	JPL · 16641
16644 Otemaedaigaku	1993 SH_{1}	Otemaedaigaku, a private university in Japan	JPL · 16644
16645 Aldalara	1993 SP_{3}	ALDA, the Asociación Larense de Astronomía, is the association of amateur astronomers of Lara State, Venezuela. Since its foundation in 1985 its members have not only engaged in astronomical activities but have developed extensive educational and outreach activity, involving students and people from the general community	JPL · 16645
16646 Sparrman	1993 SJ_{5}	Anders Sparrman (1748–1820), Swedish botanist, pupil of Linnaeus, who went around the world with James Cook's second voyage and wrote about it in A voyage to the Cape of Good Hope, towards the Antarctic polar circle, and round the world (1789)	JPL · 16646
16647 Robbydesmet	1993 SQ_{6}	Robby De Smet (born 1979), the son-in-law of the discoverer and a process foreman at a company in Antwerp (Zwijndrecht). (1789)	JPL · 16647
16648 Hossi	1993 SH_{7}	Sabine Hossenfelder (b. 1976, nicknamed "Hossi" in school), a German physicist and science communicator.	JPL · 16648
16649 Masayasu	1993 TY_{1}	Masayasu Miyahara (b. 1954), a Japanese amateur astronomer.	IAU · 16649
16650 Sakushingakuin	1993 TE_{1}	Sakushi Gakuin is a long-established school within a combined elementary, junior and senior secondary school system in Utsunomiya, Tochigi Prefecture, Japan.	JPL · 16650
16666 Liroma	1993 XL_{1}	The Meiers are a family of amateur astronomers living near Ottawa, Ontario. Linda (born 1950) is an active observer. Between 1978 and 1984, Rolf (born 1953) discovered four comets and has recently built an observatory. Son Matthew (born 1985) has joined the Royal Astronomical Society of Canada's Ottawa Center.	JPL · 16666
16669 Rionuevo	1993 XK_{3}	The Rio Nuevo project at Flandrau Science Center in Rio Nuevo, a district of Tucson, Arizona. It is an effort to understand the city's history stretching back at least 2500 years, and to preserve and develop its heritage. Tucson's Rio Nuevo project is supported by the University of Arizona. It will benefit all students of the history of the American Southwest.	JPL · 16669
16671 Tago	1994 AF_{3}	Akira Tago (born 1926) has been the honorary president at Tokyo Future University since 2008 and is an authority in educational psychology.	JPL · 16671
16672 Bedini	1994 BA_{1}	Daniele Bedini (born 1952) is currently director at a university consortium in Florence and teaches space architecture at the Space International University in Strasbourg. He wrote a thesis on space architecture, the first of its kind in Europe.	JPL · 16672
16674 Birkeland	1994 BK_{3}	Kristian Olaf Birkeland (1867–1917) was a Norwegian scientist who elucidated the nature of the aurora borealis. He constructed an electromagnetic device enabling him to simulate the light of the polar aurora by directing a beam of cathode rays (electrons) on a sphere in a vacuum tank	JPL · 16674
16675 Torii	1994 CY_{1}	From 1985 to 2014 Hidemitsu Torii (born 1947) was the director general of Sanko Gakuen in Tokyo, which specializes in welfare, early childhood education and child psychology. He is well known as an enthusiastic educator.	JPL · 16675
16676 Tinne	1994 CA_{5}	Alexine Tinne (1835–1869), a Dutch explorer and photographer who travelled through the Central Nile region and Central Africa. During her expeditions she collected plants, including several new species, and objects of art.	JPL · 16676
16680 Minamitanemachi	1994 EP_{3}	The Japanese town of Minamitanemachi, located in the southern part of Tanegashima Island, Kagoshima. It is well known as the town where a gun was introduced to Japan for the first time in 1543. It is also known for the Tanegashima Space Center.	JPL · 16680
16682 Donati	1994 FB	Giovanni Battista Donati (1826–1873), an Italian astronomer from Tuscany. He made important contributions to the early development of stellar spectroscopy, being also the first to observe a cometary spectrum. He was director of the Florence Observatory and discoverer of six comets, among them the spectacular naked-eye comet C/1858 L1.	JPL · 16682
16683 Alepieri	1994 JY	Alessandro Pieri (1969–2000) was an Italian amateur astronomer from childhood and was for many years a member of the Associazione Astrofili Valdinievole, an organization of amateur astronomers in northern Tuscany. He was an active meteor observer and an astrophotographer.	JPL · 16683
16689 Vistula	1994 PZ_{26}	Vistula river, flowing from the Beskidy Mountains of southern Poland to the Baltic Sea past Krakóv, Warsaw and Gdańsk	JPL · 16689
16690 Fabritius	1994 UR_{6}	Carel Fabritius (1622–1654, a Dutch painter and one of Rembrandt's most gifted pupils.	JPL · 16690
16693 Moseley	1994 YC_{2}	Terence J. C. A. Moseley (born 1946), editor of Stardust, 1992 Aidan P. Fitzgerald Medallist and founding member of the Irish Federation of Astronomical Societies, was the first amateur to use the recently restored six-foot Birr telescope in Sept. 2001.	JPL · 16693
16695 Terryhandley	1995 AM	Terry Handley (1952–2015) was an American amateur astronomer and discoverer of minor planets with Asperger syndrome. In the late 1980s he was recognized as the only amateur astronomer in North America measuring positions of comets and minor planets. He ran a sky survey that resulted in the discovery of 7 minor planets. Name suggested by G. W. Kronk.	JPL · 16695
16696 Villamayor	1995 BE_{7}	Waldemar Villamayor-Venialbo (born 1970), a well-known popularizer of astronomy in Paraguay and the author of numerous articles on science whose main interests are celestial mechanics and minor planets.	JPL · 16696
16700 Seiwa	1995 DZ	Seiwa village, where the Seiwa-Kogen public observatory is located, is in the center of the island of Kyushu.	JPL · 16700

== 16701–16800 ==
back to top

Named minor planet	Provisional	This minor planet was named for...	Ref; Catalog
16701 Volpe	1995 DH_{4}	Miguel A. Volpe Borgonon (born 1947), a Paraguayan amateur astronomer, professor of engineering at the Universidad Nacional de Asunción and one of the founders of the Club de Astrofìsica del Paraguay.	JPL · 16701
16702 Buxner	1995 DZ_{8}	Sanlyn R. Buxner (born 1978) is known for her work in space science education and public outreach, including curriculum development, teacher workshops, and program evaluation. Her focus is on how science research experiences empower teachers and students and improve their science understanding.	JPL · 16702
16703 Richardstrauss	1995 ER_{7}	Bavarian-German Richard Strauss (1864–1949) was a composer of the late German romantic and early-modern eras of 20th-century music who composed the operas Der Rosenkavalier and Salome, as well as the tone poems Zarathustra (1896) and Eine Alpen Symfonie (1911–1915).	IAU · 16703
16704 Taisukekaneko	1995 ED_{8}	Taisuke Kaneko (born 1981), occupational therapist working in Minamino Hospital in Hachiōji, Japan.	JPL · 16704
16705 Reinhardt	1995 EO_{8}	Max Reinhardt (Maximilian Goldmann, 1873–1943), an Austrian stage director and theater manager who worked mainly in Berlin and Vienna. He was a cofounder of the "Salzburger Festspiele". His productions of classic dramas caused an enormous stir. In 1933 he emigrated from Germany.	JPL · 16705
16706 Svojsík	1995 OE_{1}	Antonín Benjamin Svojsík (1876–1938), Czech founder of the Czechoslovak Boy Scout organization Junák in 1912. He led it from 1914 until his death and was a member of the executive committee of the world Scout movement. After repeated bans between 1939 and 1989, Junák is now the most popular Czech children's organization.	JPL · 16706
16707 Norman	1995 QP_{10}	Lennie Norman (born 1948) and his father Charlie Norman (1920–2005) were both entertaining musicians. Lennie is also a very talented stand-up comedian	JPL · 16707
16709 Auratian	1995 SH_{5}	Auratian has been the patron saint of České Budějovice since 1670. According to legend, he was a Roman soldier living in the 2nd or 3rd century, executed for his Christian faith. Originally buried in the Calixt catacombs in Rome, his remains were transferred to Bohemia in 1634. Named on the 750th anniversary of the town.	JPL · 16709
16710 Kluyver	1995 SL_{20}	Helena A. Kluyver (1909–2001) was a Dutch astronomer who worked on the orbits of comets. She was also known for her research on stellar motions in the Hyades cluster and was an assistant at the General Secretary Office of the International Astronomical Union for many years.	JPL · 16710
16711 Ka-Dar	1995 SM_{29}	The astronomical observatory of Ka-Dar scientific center is the first private observatory in Russia open to the public. Founded on 2004 June 8, the observatory works for the popularization of scientific activity by amateur astronomers and their collaboration with professional astronomers	JPL · 16711
16713 Airashi	1995 SV_{52}	Airashi, located in the center of Kagoshima prefecture, is a new city created in 2010 by the combination of three towns. Airashi contains a number of historic sites	JPL · 16713
16714 Arndt	1995 SM_{54}	German patriotic writer and poet Ernst Moritz Arndt (1769–1860), born on the island of Rügen, was a professor of history at the University of Greifswald (which now bears his name), as well as in Bonn. A passionate agitator and singer of the German Wars for Liberation, he stood up for a revival in Germany	JPL · 16714
16715 Trettenero	1995 UN_{5}	Virgilio Trettenero (1822–1868), an Italian astronomer who succeeded Santini as professor of astronomy at Padua. At the observatory there he observed minor planets, comets and eclipses and calculated orbits and ephemerides.	JPL · 16715
16718 Morikawa	1995 UA_{9}	Yoshiki Morikawa (born 1981), a Japanese amateur astronomer and popularizer of astronomy in Tokyo.	JPL · 16718
16719 Mizokami	1995 UF_{45}	Yoshihiro Mizokami (born 1952), the president of the steering committee of the Inagawa Observatory since 2002.	JPL · 16719
16723 Fumiofuke	1995 WX_{8}	Fumio Fuke (1949–2007) was a Japanese aerospace engineer who contributed to the success of the mission `KAGUYA' as a leader of the design and development of transponders used for the RSAT mission, which enabled the measurement of the gravity field of the far side of the Moon	JPL · 16723
16724 Ullilotzmann	1995 YV_{3}	Ulrich (‘Ulli') Lotzmann (born 1956) is a German space historian, artist and astrophotographer. He is an expert in Apollo era spaceflight crew equipment and spacecraft systems and is a key contributor to the Apollo Lunar Surface Journal. Name suggested by E. Jones and K. Glover.	JPL · 16724
16725 Toudono	1996 CE_{3}	Toudono mountain (height 1203 meters) is located in the west of the discoverer's home town, Shirataka, Yamagata prefecture	JPL · 16725
16730 Nijisseiki	1996 HJ_{1}	The Niji-sseiki fruit is a type of locally cultivated pear representative of and having a strong affinity to Tottori prefecture, a major pear producing area in which Saji village is located. In English, Niji-sseiki translates as "twentieth Century".	JPL · 16730
16731 Mitsumata	1996 HK_{1}	Mitsumata is an ingredient used in traditional Japanese papermaking and represents a local Saji industry. Saji village produces the major share of this country's handmade Japanese paper, the paper of choice for the writing of calligraphy.	JPL · 16731
16736 Tongariyama	1996 JW_{2}	Tongariyama mountain (height 901 meters) is located in the west of the discoverer's home town, Shirataka, Yamagata prefecture	JPL · 16736
16740 Kipthorne	1996 KT_{8}	Kip Thorne (born 1940) is an astrophysicist working principally in the field of gravitation physics. The youngest full professor in the history of the California Institute of Technology, he was coauthor of the famous book, Gravitation (1973), with John Wheeler and Charles Mismer.	JPL · 16740
16742 Zink	1996 ON	Johann Josef Zink (1842–1920), a publisher who issued postcards and guides in South Bohemia.	JPL · 16742
16744 Antonioleone	1996 OJ_{2}	Antonio Leone (born 1940), an Italian amateur astronomer from Taranto has developed principles of orbital motion in a manner easy for amateurs to understand since the early 1970s. This has resulted in two books, Introduzione alla Meccanica Celeste and, with a co-author, Elementi di Calcolo delle Orbite.	JPL · 16744
16745 Zappa	1996 PF_{5}	Giovanni Zappa (1884–1923) an Italian astronomer who was an assistant at the observatory of the Collegio Romano, adjunct astronomer at Catania, astronomer at Capodimonte and director of the observatory of Collurania and Collegio Romano. Interested in classical astronomy, he calculated orbits of minor planets and comets.	JPL · 16745
16749 Vospini	1996 QE	Giancarlo Vospini (1935–2017) was an electronic engineer by profession and amateur astronomer by vocation. He was a member of the Sormano Astronomical Observatory and particularly active in popularization.	JPL · 16749
16750 Marisandoz	1996 QL	Mari Sandoz (1896–1966), an American historian, biographer and novelist who wrote 21 books and stories about life on the Great Plains. Her first book, Old Jules, was published in 1935 after it won the Atlantic Nonfiction Prize. She also wrote Crazy Horse, a biography of the Sioux Chief, and Cheyenne Autumn, about Native Americans leaving the reservation.	JPL · 16750
16755 Cayley	1996 RE_{1}	Arthur Cayley (1821–1895), an English mathematician who started out as a practicing lawyer but in 1863 became a professor of mathematics at Cambridge. He published papers on many topics in algebra and geometry and was the founder, together with Sylvester, of the theory of algebraic invariants.	JPL · 16755
16756 Keuskamp	1996 RQ_{11}	Diederik H.G. Keuskamp (1915–1992) was a professor of anesthesiology and a Dutch amateur astronomer with a great interest in comets. As a medical professional he contributed to the development of methods in the field of artificial respiration.	JPL · 16756
16757 Luoxiahong	1996 SC_{6}	Luoxia Hong (140–87 BC) was the most famous folk astronomer in ancient China. He performed accurate observations with instruments (e.g., the equatorial armillary sphere) he made himself. He also produced Tai Chu Calendar, the first mathematical astronomy system in China, the standard for two millennia.	MPC · 16757
16759 Furuyama	1996 TJ_{7}	Shigeru Furuyama (born 1953) is a post-office clerk and renowned amateur astronomer in Japan. During his nine-year visual search for comets, Furuyama independently discovered C/1975 T2. In 1979 he changed from visual to photographic observing and later discovered C/1987 W2.	MPC · 16759
16760 Masanori	1996 TY_{7}	Masanori Sato (born 1952) is a member of Matsue Astronomy Club. He has popularized astronomy in Shimane prefecture and is an observing partner of the discoverer.	JPL · 16760
16761 Hertz	1996 TE_{8}	Heinrich Hertz (1857–1894), a German physicist who substantially advanced knowledge of electricity. His experiments demonstrated the existence and examined the nature of electromagnetic waves, thereby opening the road to some of the most important achievements of modern technology.	JPL · 16761
16765 Agnesi	1996 UA	Maria Gaetana Agnesi (1718–1799), an Italian mathematician who became the first woman in the western world who can properly be called a mathematician. She wrote a treatise on algebra that was widely translated, and in 1750 she was appointed to a professorship at the University of Bologna.	JPL · 16765
16766 Righi	1996 UP	Augusto Righi (1850–1920), an Italian physicist who continued Heinrich Hertz's research on electromagnetism and served as an inspiration to his student Marconi.	JPL · 16766
16770 Angkor Wat	1996 UD_{3}	Angkor Wat is a temple complex in Cambodia, built from the early twelfth century, that is the largest religious archaeological site in the world.	JPL · 16770
16777 Bosma	1996 VD_{29}	Albert Bosma (born 1948) is a Dutch astronomer known for his 1978 thesis "The distribution of neutral hydrogen in spiral galaxies of various morphological types", in which he suggested that galaxies contain significant dark matter.	IAU · 16777
16779 Mittelman	1996 WH_{2}	David Ross Mittelman (1954–2017) was an amateur astronomer and astrophotographer as well as a patron of astronomy, education and medicine. He was instrumental in establishing the MDW Hydrogen-Alpha Sky Survey to create a large-scale mosaic of the heavens with deep CCD images.	JPL · 16779
16781 Renčín	1996 XU_{18}	Vladimír Renčín (born 1941) is a Czech graphic artist, illustrator and cartoonist. He published several books of cartoons, where various features of the Czech character are illustrated.	JPL · 16781
16783 Bychkov	1996 XY_{25}	Victor Dmitrievich Bychkov (born 1952), an astronomer at the Special Astrophysical Observatory, Zelenchukskaya.	JPL · 16783
16788 Alyssarose	1997 AR_{2}	Alyssa Rose Rhoden (born 1980), an American planetary scientist who studies icy moons throughout the Solar System and identified the first geologic evidence of Europa's obliquity. She is a professor at Arizona State University, a mother, a runner, and in her spare time works to promote global food sustainability.	JPL · 16788
16790 Yuuzou	1997 AZ_{4}	Yuuzou Hasegawa (1956–2007) was a Japanese aerospace engineer who contributed to the success of the mission `KAGUYA' as a leader of design, development and operations of Ground Test Facilities/Equipment, thereby realizing some unusual verifications and tests that assured 15 special KAGUYA flights	JPL · 16790
16794 Cucullia	1997 CQ_{1}	The caterpillar of the North American Asteroid Moth Cucullia asteroides feeds on flowers of the family Asteraceae. The Latin word cucullus means a hood, and it refers to a hood-like arrangement of hairs on the thorax of the adult moth. The citation was prepared by J. B. Tatum (Src).	JPL · 16794
16796 Shinji	1997 CY_{16}	Shinji Tsuruta (1957–2008) was a Japanese aerospace engineer who contributed to the success of the mission `KAGUYA' as a leader of design and development of the batteries that supplied electrical energy to all the on-board components of the KAGUYA, OKINA and OUNA spacecraft	JPL · 16796
16797 Wilkerson	1997 CA_{17}	Winston S. Wilkerson, uncle of the first discoverer's wife, is a member of the physics faculty at The Cooper Union for the Advancement of Science and Art in New York. His interests have concentrated on variable stars, and he has been a member of the American Association of Variable Star Observers for many years.	JPL · 16797

== 16801–16900 ==
back to top

Named minor planet	Provisional	This minor planet was named for...	Ref; Catalog
16801 Petřínpragensis	1997 SC_{2}	Petřín, Petrin Hill and gardens in Prague, site of an observation tower (built in 1891 and modelled on the Eiffel Tower) and the Stefanik Observatory (Štefánikova Hvězdárna) † ‡	MPC · 16801
16802 Rainer	1997 SP_{3}	Rainer Gebetsroither (1976–1998) devoted his life to observations of nature as well as to the history and technology of railways. He suffered from a serious heart disease since his birth His parents Karin and Uwe are long-term members of the Linzer Astronomische Gemeinschaft (Linzer A.G.).	JPL · 16802
16804 Bonini	1997 SX_{15}	Claire Bonini (born 1951) is a schoolteacher who been active in teaching astronomy in French primary schools. She is the daughter of Robert and Henriette Chemin, observers at the Côte d'Azur Observatory Schmidt telescope. Her 1990 experiment in a Sevran kindergarten was extended nationally and to other age groups.	JPL · 16804
16807 Terasako	1997 TW_{25}	Masanori Terasako (born 1951), a renowned amateur astronomer in Japan.	JPL · 16807
16809 Galápagos	1997 US	The Galápagos Islands are a world heritage site and provide a living history of evolution. Assisted by the Charles Darwin Research Station located there, scientists have made many discoveries. The station also helps to preserve this National Park with its famous animals, such as the giant tortoises and the Darwin finches.	MPC · 16809
16810 Pavelaleksandrov	1997 UY_{2}	Pavel Alexandrov (1896–1982) Pavel Alexandrov was a Russian mathematician and a student of Pavel Urysohn, with whom he later wrote a fundamental paper on compact topological spaces. After a stint as a theater producer, he became a professor at Moscow State University.	JPL · 16810
16813 Ronmastaler	1997 UT_{6}	Ronald A. Mastaler (born 1955) is an atmospheric scientist and a fluent translator and interpreter of the Russian language. With the Spacewatch project since 2013, he has been a prolific asteroid astrometrist.	JPL · 16813
16817 Onderlička	1997 UU_{10}	Bedřich Onderlička (1923–1994), was a prominent Czech astrophysicist and enthusiastic pedagogue who headed the department of astrophysics of Masaryk University in Brno, Czech Republic. He specialized in stellar kinematics and chemistry of late-type stars.	JPL · 16817
16826 Daisuke	1997 WA_{2}	Daisuke Miyajima (1958–2007) was a Japanese aerospace engineer who contributed much to the success of `KAGUYA' as a lead engineer of EMC design, control and verification tests that reduced the EMC noise and provided a quiet environment for mission sensors that needed to hear even a tiny voice from the moon	JPL · 16826
16829 Richardfrench	1997 WG_{7}	Richard G. French (born 1949), an American planetary astronomer, director of the Whitin Observatory, and professor at Wellesley College, who studies planetary rings and small Solar System bodies by means of occultation. He has also been a team member of the Cassini–Huygens mission to Saturn, leading the Radio Science Team (Src).	IAU · 16829
16847 Sanpoloamosciano	1997 XK_{10}	The Astronomical Observatory of San Polo a Mosciano (Osservatorio Astronomico di San Polo a Mosciano), the discovery site of this minor planet. The observatory is located at the small town of the same name, near Florence, Italy, and operated by the Associazione Astrofili Fiorentini. The first image of this minor planet shows it close to the M1 nebula. This was one of the few observations of minor planets taken at the observatory, which is usually involved in the study of variable stars.	JPL · 16847
16852 Nuredduna	1997 YP_{2}	Created by Majorcan poet Miquel Costa i Llobera in his poem The legacy of the Greek genius, Nuredduna is a priestess, a great seeress who belonged to a native tribe that built many megalithic monuments called Talaiots that even nowadays are present in the Balearic islands.	JPL · 16852
16853 Masafumi	1997 YV_{2}	Masafumi Kimura (1959–2009) was a Japanese aerospace engineer who calculated the spacecraft orbit and contributed much to the success of `KAGUYA' as leader of design of the high-gain antenna that allows communication between the Moon and the Earth	JPL · 16853
16856 Banach	1997 YE_{8}	Stefan Banach (1892–1945) was a Polish mathematician and professor at the University of Lviv. His major contributions were in functional analysis, particularly the theory of complete normed linear spaces, now generally known as Banach spaces.	JPL · 16856
16857 Goodall	1997 YZ_{8}	Kirk Goodall (born 1964) was the Mars Pathfinder Web Engineer, and was instrumental in setting up the relationships with other countries and industry for mirror websites that allowed Mars Pathfinder to provide information to millions of people around the world.	JPL · 16857
16861 Lipovetsky	1997 YZ_{11}	Valentin Alexandrovich Lipovetsky (1945–1996) was a senior researcher at the Special Astrophysical Observatory, Zelenchukskaya, and headed a group studying Blue Compact Galaxies.	JPL · 16861
16869 Košinár	1998 AV_{8}	Ladislav Košinár (born 1929), mentor of amateur astronomy in Slovakia, founded the astronomical observatory in Sobotište in 1972. Long-time chairman of the Slovak Union of Amateur Astronomers, he is now an honorary member of the SUAA and of the Slovak Astronomical Society. The name was suggested by P. Rapavý	JPL · 16869
16874 Kurtwahl	1998 BK_{2}	Kurt Wahl, 2003 Intel STS mentor. He teaches at the Troy High School, Fullerton, California.	JPL · 16874
16878 Tombickler	1998 BL_{9}	Thomas C. Bickler (born 1950) is responsible for the NEAT camera electronics. He has experience with imaging instruments and has worked with CCD camera electronics systems extensively. During his 21 years at the Jet Propulsion Laboratory he helped develop and deliver flight hardware for Galileo, Cassini and Space Telescope. He is also a member of the Wide Field Camera 3 development team.	JPL · 16878
16879 Campai	1998 BH_{10}	Paolo Campai (born 1957), an Italian amateur astronomer from Florence, is principally involved in astronomical photography and teaching. The discoverers met him in the course of observations of alpha Phoenicis and comet 1P/Halley in 1985 on a superb night near Florence	JPL · 16879
16881 Angelinmathew	1998 BH_{12}	Angelin T. Mathew (b. 2003) was awarded second place in the 2019 Intel International Science and Engineering Fair for her materials science project. She attended the American Heritage School, Plantation, Florida, U.S.A.	IAU · 16881
16883 Adeenedenton	1998 BA_{20}	C. Adeene Denton (b. 1994), an American planetary geophysicist.	IAU · 16883
16887 Blouke	1998 BE_{26}	Morley Blouke (born 1941) is a well-known microelectronician, whose pioneering development of thinned CCDs gave rise to the WF/PC I focal plane. He now heads advanced development at Scientific Imaging Technologies, Inc., in Tigard, Oregon.	JPL · 16887
16888 Michaelbarber	1998 BM_{26}	Michael R. Barber (born 1947), an American lawyer and amateur astronomer in the gamma-ray bursts field at the Santa Barbara Astronomical Group, co-founded a small CCD brand that in 1991 developed star tracking equipment, allowing the start of CCD revolution in the amateur astronomer's world.	JPL · 16888
16892 Vaissière	1998 DN_{1}	Franck Vaissière (born 1958) has been responsible for the technical activity to the T60 association at the Pic du Midi Observatory. He also took part in H alpha coronographic observations and cowrote a book on this extraordinary astronomical site. He has long been treasurer of the Association des Utilisateurs de Détecteurs Electroniques.	JPL · 16892
16900 Lozère	1998 DQ_{13}	Mont Lozère is the highest summit of the Cevennes mountains of the Massif Central in France at 1699 meters. The discovering Pises Observatory is located nearby. Lozère is also the name of the 48th French département.	JPL · 16900

== 16901–17000 ==
back to top

Named minor planet	Provisional	This minor planet was named for...	Ref; Catalog
16901 Johnbrooks	1998 DJ_{14}	John J. Brooks (born 1933), a mechanical engineer and amateur astronomer in the gamma-ray bursts field at the Santa Barbara Astronomical Group, co-founded a small CCD brand that in 1991 developed star tracking equipment, allowing the start of the CCD revolution in the amateur astronomer's world.	JPL · 16901
16906 Giovannisilva	1998 DY_{23}	Giovanni Silva (1882–1957), an Italian astronomer who was an assistant at the International Latitude Station at Carloforte and later director of the Padua Observatory until 1952. He contributed to classical astronomy, celestial mechanics, geodesy, astrophysics and the calculus of probability.	JPL · 16906
16908 Groeselenberg	1998 DD_{33}	Groeselenberg, a hill in Uccle, Belgium, and location of the Uccle Observatory	MPC · 16908
16909 Miladejager	1998 DX_{33}	Mila De Jager (born 2005) is the first granddaughter of the discoverer, Eric Walter Elst, and daughter of Sigyn and Philip De Jager.	JPL · 16909
16912 Rhiannon	1998 EP_{8}	Rhiannon, a Welsh goddess and a mistress of the Singing Birds. Sometimes she appeared as a beautiful woman in dazzling gold on a white horse. She is a version of the proto-Celtic horse-goddess Epona.	JPL · 16912
16915 Bredthauer	1998 FR_{10}	Richard Bredthauer (born 1946) has been a CCD designer for the last 23 years, providing high-performance CCDs to the astronomical community. Richard has also fabricated several flight CCDs for NASA missions. including the Hubble Space Telescope.	JPL · 16915
16920 Larrywalker	1998 FR_{37}	Larry Walker, 2003 Intel STS mentor. He teaches at the Oak Ridge High School, Conroe, Texas.	JPL · 16920
16929 Hurník	1998 FP_{73}	Ilja Hurník (1922–2013), a Czech composer, pianist, writer, musical pedagogue, speaker and popularizer, has a keen interest in science, particularly in astronomy. The name was suggested by participants of the meeting organized on the occasion of naming the Johann Palisa Observatory and Planetarium in Ostrava-Poruba.	JPL · 16929
16930 Respighi	1998 FF_{74}	Lorenzo Respighi (1824–1889), an Italian astronomer who was professor of optics and astronomy and director successively of the observatories of Bologna and of Campidoglio in Rome. He compiled stellar catalogues, observed the planets and discovered three comets. He introduced the use of the objective prism in stellar spectroscopy, Italian astronomer	JPL · 16930
16934 Kevinmeng	1998 FA_{91}	Kevin Meng (b. 2002) was awarded best of category and first place in the 2019 Intel International Science and Engineering Fair for his robotics and intelligent machines project. He attended the Plano West Senior High School, Plano, Texas, U.S.A.	IAU · 16934
16938 Nalanimiller	1998 FN_{121}	Nalani Leah Miller (b. 2001) was awarded second place in the 2019 Intel International Science and Engineering Fair for her biomedical and health sciences project. She attended the Kamehameha Schools Kapalama Campus, Honolulu, Hawaii, U.S.A.	IAU · 16938
16939 Rishabhmisra	1998 FP_{121}	Rishabh Misra (b. 2001) was awarded second place in the 2019 Intel International Science and Engineering Fair for his embedded systems team project. He attended the Thomas Jefferson High School for Science and Technology, Alexandria, Virginia, U.S.A.	IAU · 16939
16944 Wangler	1998 HK_{45}	Julie Wangler, 2003 Intel STS mentor. She teaches at the Los Alamos High School, Los Alamos, New Mexico.	JPL · 16944
16946 Farnham	1998 HJ_{51}	Tony L. Farnham (born 1964), an American astronomer and discoverer of minor planets at the University of Maryland, who has studied the dynamics of cometary dust and determined comet rotation states. He has also contributed to the Deep Impact mission by improving the standardization of filter photometry.	JPL · 16946
16947 Wikrent	1998 HN_{80}	Brian Wikrent, 2003 Intel STS mentor. He teaches at the Robbinsdale Cooper High School, New Hope, Minnesota.	MPC · 16947
16951 Carolus Quartus	1998 KJ	Charles IV, Holy Roman Emperor (1316–1378), king of Bohemia and Holy Roman Emperor, supported cultural and scientific advancement. Charles University, which he founded in Prague, was the first university in central Europe. During his 30-year reign the Czech lands did not experience the hardship of wars. The name was suggested by M. Juřík.	JPL · 16951
16952 Peteschultz	1998 KX_{3}	Peter H. Schultz (born 1944), an American geologist at Brown University, has studied cratering phenomena experimentally and in the field. He has played a major role in defining and developing the Deep Impact mission, particularly through his cratering experiments at the NASA Ames Vertical Gun Range.	JPL · 16952
16953 Besicovitch	1998 KE_{5}	Abram Samoilovitch Besicovitch (1891–1970), a Russian mathematician who taught at various institutions in the Soviet Union and later at the University of Cambridge. He had an astounding geometric intuition and proved many counter-intuitive results, particularly with regard to sets of points of fractal dimension.	MPC · 16953
16954 Annikamorgan	1998 KT_{48}	Annika Lee Morgan (b. 2001) was awarded best of category and first place in the 2019 Intel International Science and Engineering Fair for her biochemistry project. She attended the Joel Barlow High School, Redding, Connecticut, U.S.A.	IAU · 16954
16958 Klaasen	1998 PF	Kenneth P. Klaasen (born 1946), a geomorphologist and expert in scientific operations of spacecraft at the Jet Propulsion Laboratory, has designed observational sequences for numerous planetary missions, most recently for Deep Impact, for which he has also overseen instrument calibration.	JPL · 16958
16961 Mullahy	1998 QV_{73}	Matthew Mullahy (b. 2001) was awarded second place in the 2019 Intel International Science and Engineering Fair for his behavioral and social sciences project. He attended the Smithtown High School East, St. James, New York, U.S.A.	IAU · 16961
16962 Elizawoolard	1998 QP_{93}	Elizabeth Woolard, 2003 Intel STS mentor. She teaches at the William G. Enloe High School, Raleigh, North Carolina.	MPC · 16962
16967 Marcosbosso	1998 SR_{132}	Marcos Federico Bosso (born 1987), 2003 Intel STS winner. At the time, he attended the I.P.E.M. No 80, Dr. Luis Federico Leloir, Berrotaran, Cordoba, Argentina.	MPC · 16967
16969 Helamuda	1998 UM_{20}	Hessisches Landesmuseum Darmstadt (Helamuda), the museum of the federal state of Hessen. This unique institution features exquisite collections in both fine arts and natural sciences and conducts paleontological excavations at the nearby Messel site.	JPL · 16969
16972 Neish	1998 WK_{11}	Catherine D. Neish (born 1981) is a professor at the University of Western Ontario who studies Titan, the Moon and Venus using orbital radar. Previously known by the moniker Katie Dot, she is an avid scuba diver, a champion for social justice, and mother to Penelope.	JPL · 16972
16973 Gaspari	1998 WR_{19}	Luciano Gaspari (born 1986), 2003 Intel STS winner. He attended the I.P.E.M. No 80, Dr. Luis Federico Leloir, Berrotaran, Cordoba, Argentina.	MPC · 16973
16974 Iphthime	1998 WR_{21}	Iphthime from Greek mythology. She was Penelope's sister who appears to her in a dream and comforts her as she is grieving.	JPL · 16974
16975 Delamere	1998 YX_{29}	W. Alan Delamere (born 1935), an American astronomer who recently retired from Ball Aerospace & Technologies, has made major contributions to cometary science, ranging from management of the Halley multicolor camera on the Giotto mission to his insightful approach to the original design of the Deep Impact mission and HiRISE.	JPL · 16975
16982 Tsinghua	1999 AS_{9}	Tsinghua University is one of the most renowned research universities in China founded in 1911. It has made significant contributions to the development of science, technology, culture and the economy of China	JPL · 16982
16984 Veillet	1999 AA_{25}	Christian Veillet (born 1954), a French astronomer and discoverer of minor planets was for several years head of the lunar-ranging station at the Côte d'Azur Observatory. Now senior astronomer for the Canada–France–Hawaii Telescope, he is project scientist for the megaprime project. He recently discovered that the trans-Neptunian object 1998 WW31 is a binary.	MPC · 16984
16986 Archivestef	1999 AR_{34}	Stephanie McLaughlin (born 1961), an American space scientist who has worked at the University of Maryland both for the Small Bodies Node of the Planetary Data System and for the Deep Impact project, contributing to ground testing of scientific instruments and preparation of the complete scientific archive.	JPL · 16986
16996 Dahir	1999 CM_{32}	Roberto Daniel Dahir (born 1985), 2003 Intel STS finalist. He attended the E.P.E.T. No 6, Realico, La Pampa, Argentina.	MPC · 16996
16997 Garrone	1999 CO_{32}	Nestor Juan Garrone (born 1984), 2003 Intel STS finalist. He attended the E.P.E.T. No 6, Realico, La Pampa, Argentina.	MPC · 16997
16998 Estelleweber	1999 CG_{46}	Estelle Lela Weber (born 1986), 2003 Intel STS finalist. She attended the Wollumbin High School, Murwillumbah, Queensland, Australia.	MPC · 16998
16999 Ajstewart	1999 CE_{47}	Andrew James Stewart (born 1987), 2003 Intel STS finalist. He attended the Karabar Distance Education Centre, Queanbeyan, NSW, Australia.	MPC · 16999
17000 Medvedev	1999 CV_{48}	Alexandr V. Medvedev (born 1985), 2003 Intel STS and Karl Menger Memorial Prize finalist. He attended the BSU Liceum, Minsk, Belarus.	MPC · 17000

back to top

Preceded by 15,001–16,000	Meanings of minor-planet names List of minor planets: 16,001–17,000	Succeeded by 17,001–18,000
