= Bocchoris =

Bocchoris may refer to:

== In history ==
- Bakenranef, known by the ancient Greeks as Bocchoris, a king of the twenty-fourth dynasty of Egypt
- Bocchoris (city), an ancient city in northern Majorca, Spain, that was federated to Rome

== In zoology ==
- Bocchoris (moth), a genus of moths of the family Crambidae
