= Pont de Cubelles =

Pont de Cubelles Pont romà de Pollença
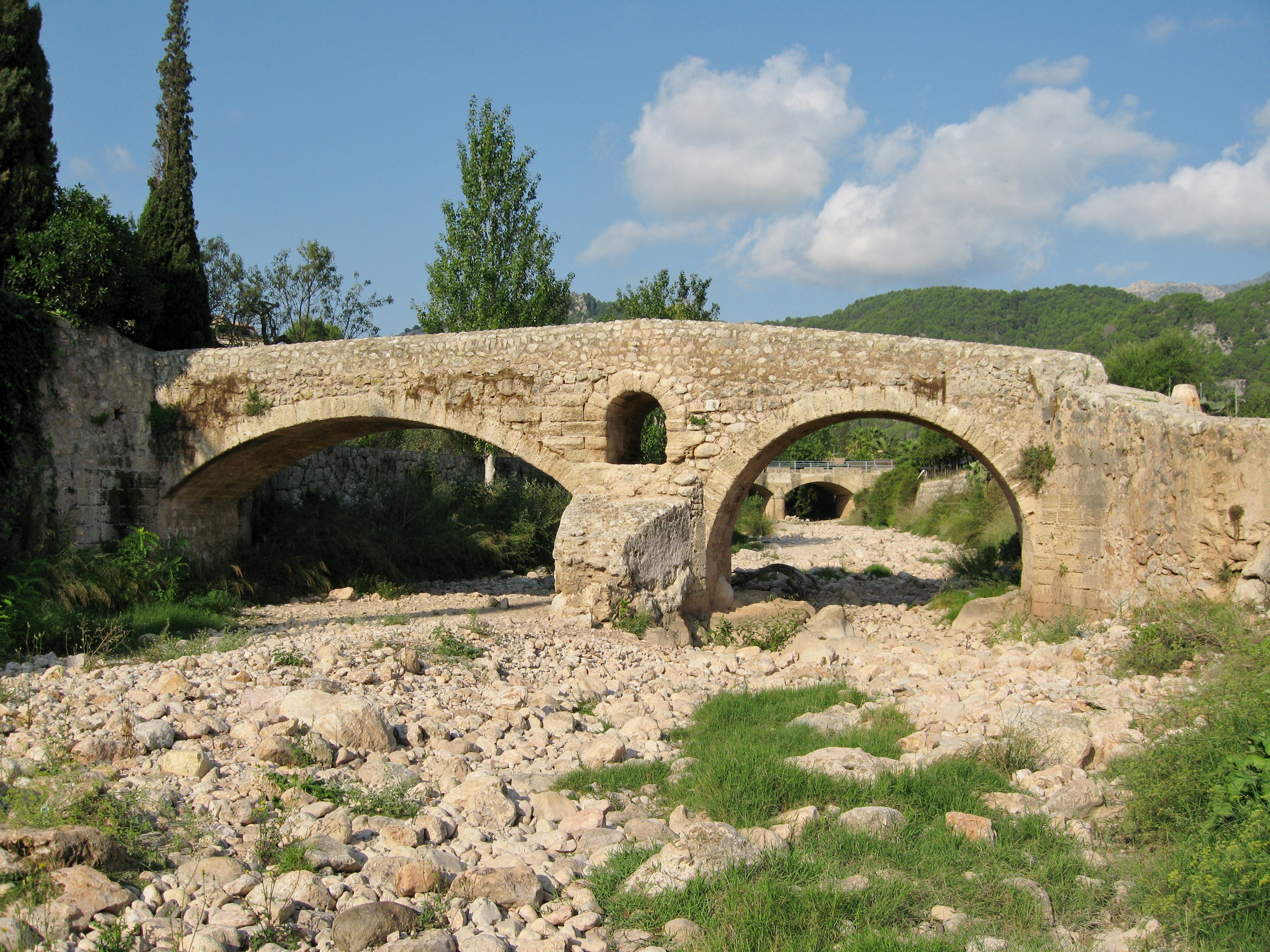
- The bridge at the outskirts of Pollença
- Coordinates: 39.882631°N 3.015086°E
- Crosses: Torrent de Sant Jordi
- Locale: Pollença, Mallorca, Spain

Characteristics
- Material: Stone
- Width: 2.9 m

History
- Construction end: Medieval (with later modifications)

Location
- Interactive map of Pont de Cubelles

The Pont de Cubelles, more commonly known as the Roman Bridge of Pollença, is a stone bridge located at the entrance to the Ternelles valley in Pollença, on the island of Mallorca, Spain. It spans the Torrent de Sant Jordi. Despite its popular name, its origin in Roman times has not been demonstrated and remains the subject of historiographical debate.

== Description ==
The bridge currently consists of two surviving spans with unequal arches, constructed from dressed ashlar stone. One arch is a round arch, while the other is slightly flattened, adapting to the differing width of the stream.

Between the two arches stands a central pier with triangular starlings facing both upstream and downstream, as well as a small relieving arch located above.

The bridge has an overall width of approximately 2.9 metres, with a usable roadway of about 1.9 metres, sufficient for single-direction cart traffic. The upper structure is made of more irregular masonry, while the arches themselves display more careful construction.

Architectural studies identify features typical of medieval bridges, such as the use of semicircular arches and construction techniques adapted to a fluvial environment, although some elements may belong to different construction phases.

== History ==
Documentary evidence indicates that the bridge already existed at the beginning of the 15th century; repair works are recorded in 1403. At that time it was known as the Pont de Cubelles or Pont de l’Horta, referring to the nearby agricultural area. The bridge formed part of the communication routes between Pollença and the Ternelles valley, an area of hydrological and agricultural importance since the Middle Ages.

Throughout the following centuries, the bridge appears in municipal and notarial records under these traditional names, with no reference to a Roman origin. The designation “Roman bridge” only emerged in the late 19th century, likely promoted by local scholars in the context of renewed interest in Pollença’s historical past.

This name quickly became established in both scholarly literature and popular usage, despite lacking conclusive archaeological evidence. At the time, the main Roman settlement in the area was located on the coast at the Civitas Bocchoritana. The growth of tourism and cultural promotion in the 20th century further reinforced the name.

The bridge’s origin remains uncertain. Some researchers have suggested that it may incorporate a Roman foundation, possibly dating to the 1st century AD, later rebuilt in the medieval period.
