= Patronage in ancient Rome =

Social relationship

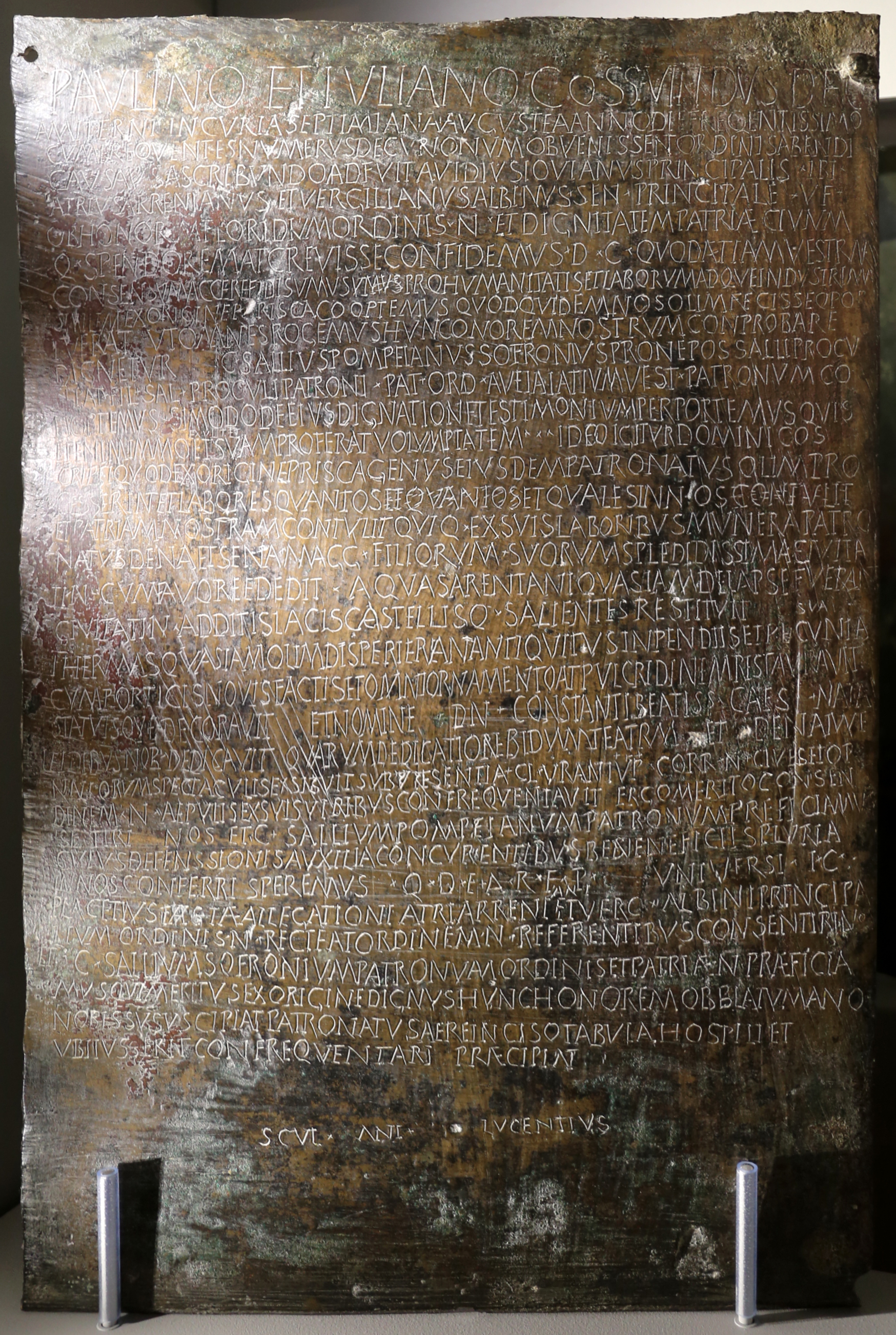
A tabula patronatus from Amiternum, 325–335 AD

Patronage (clientela) was the distinctive relationship in ancient Roman society between the patronus ('patron') and their cliens ('client'). Apart from the patron-client relationship between individuals, there were also client kingdoms and tribes, whose rulers were in a subordinate relationship to the Roman state.

The relationship was hierarchical, but obligations were mutual. The patron was the protector, sponsor, and benefactor of the client; the technical term for this protection was patrocinium. Although typically the client was of inferior social class, a patron and client might even hold the same social rank, but the former would possess greater wealth, power, or prestige that enabled him to help or do favors for the client.

From the emperor at the top to the commoner at the bottom, the bonds between these groups found formal expression in the legal definition of patrons' responsibilities to clients. Patronage relationships were not exclusively between two people and also existed between a general and his soldiers, a founder and colonists, and a conqueror and a dependent foreign community.

== Nature of clientela ==
Benefits a client may be granted include legal representation in court, loans of money, influencing business deals or marriages, and supporting a client's candidacy for political office or a priesthood. Arranging marriages for their daughters, clients were often able to secure new patrons and extend their influence in the political arena. In return for these services, the clients were expected to offer their services to their patron as needed. A client's service to the patron included accompanying the patron in Rome or when he went to war, ransoming him if he was captured, and supporting him during political campaigns.

Requests were usually made by clientela at a daily morning reception at the patron's home, known as the salutatio. The patron would receive his clients at dawn in the atrium and tablinum, after which the clients would escort the patron to the forum. The number of clients who accompanied their patron was seen as a symbol of the patron's prestige. The client was regarded as a minor member of their patron's gens, entitled to assist in its sacra gentilicia, and bound to contribute to the cost of them. The client was subject to the jurisdiction and discipline of the gens, and was entitled to burial in its common sepulchre.

One of the major spheres of activity within patron–client relations was the law courts, but clientela was not itself a legal contract, although it was supported by law from earliest Roman times. The pressures to uphold one's obligations were primarily moral, founded on ancestral custom, and on qualities of good faith on the part of the patron and loyalty on the part of the client. The patronage relationship was not a discrete one, but a network, since a patronus might himself be obligated to someone of higher status or greater power. A client might have more than one patron, whose interests could come into conflict. While the Roman familia ('family', but more broadly the "household") was the building block of society, interlocking networks of patronage created highly complex social bonds.

Reciprocity ethics played a major role in the patron-client system. Favors given from patron to client and client to patron do not cancel each other; instead, the giving of favors and counter favors was symbolic of the personal relationship between patron and client. As a consequence, the act of returning a favor was done more out of a sense of gratuity and less so because a favor needed to be returned.

The regulation of the patronage relationship was believed by the Greek historians Dionysius and Plutarch to be one of the early concerns of Romulus. Hence, it was dated to the very founding of Rome. In the earliest periods, patricians would have served as patrons. Both patricius, 'patrician', and patronus are related to the Latin word pater, 'father', in this sense symbolically, indicating the patriarchal nature of Roman society. Although other societies have similar systems, the patronus cliens relationship was "peculiarly congenial" to Roman politics and the sense of familia in the Roman Republic. An important person demonstrated their prestige or dignitas by the number of clients they had.

== Patronus and libertus ==
When a slave was manumitted, the former owner became their patron. The freedman (libertus) had social obligations to their patron, which might involve campaigning on their behalf if the patron ran for election, doing requested jobs or errands, or continuing a sexual relationship that began in servitude. In return, the patron was expected to ensure a certain degree of material security for their client. Allowing one's clients to become destitute or entangled in unjust legal proceedings would reflect poorly on the patron and diminish their prestige.

== Changing nature of patronage ==
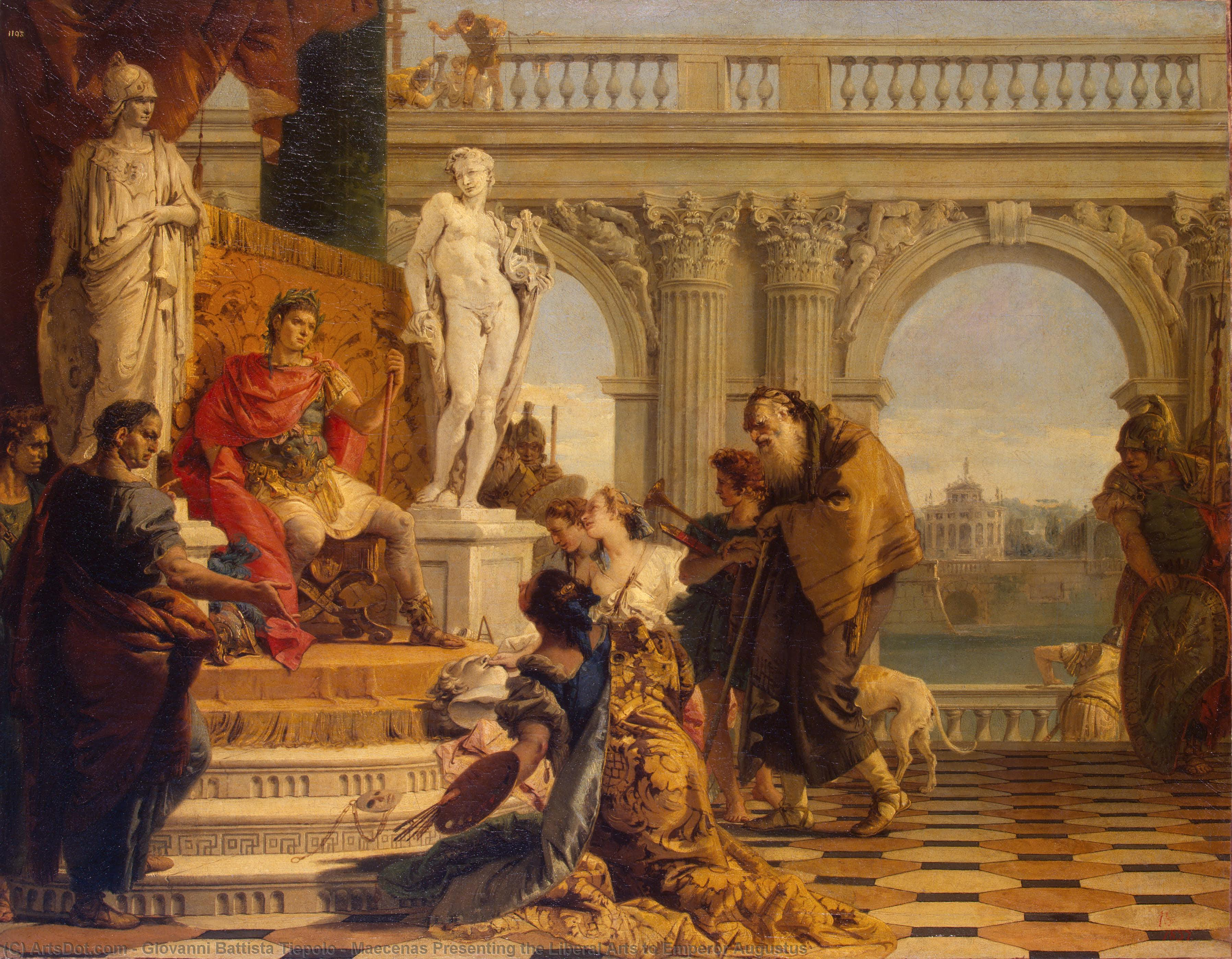
Maecenas Presenting the Liberal Arts, 1743, by Giovanni Battista Tiepolo depicting Augustus in a fanciful setting as a patron whose support is sought

The complex patronage relationships changed with the social pressures during the late Republic, when terms such as patronus, cliens and patrocinium are used in a more restricted sense than amicitia, 'friendship', including political friendships and alliances, or hospitium, reciprocal "guest–host" bonds between families. It can be difficult to distinguish patrocinium or clientela, amicitia, and hospitium, since their benefits and obligations overlap. Traditional clientela began to lose its importance as a social institution during the 2nd century BC; Fergus Millar doubts that it was the dominant force in Roman elections that it has often been seen as.

Throughout the evolution from republic to empire we see the most diversity between patrons. Patrons from all positions of power sought to build their power through the control of clients and resources. More and more patronage extended over entire communities whether based on political decree, benefaction by an individual who becomes the community's patron, or by the community formally adopting a patron.

Both sides had expectations of one another. The community expected protection from outside forces, while the patron expected a loyal following for things such as political campaigning and manpower should the need arise. The extent of a person's client relationships was often taken into account when looking for an expression of their potential political power.

Patronage in the late empire differed from patronage in the republic. Patrons protected individual clients from the tax collector and other public obligations. In return, clients gave them money or services. Some clients even surrendered ownership of their land to their patron. The emperors were unable to prevent this type of patronage effectively. The significance of clientela changed along with the social order during late antiquity. By the 10th century, clientela meant a contingent of armed retainers ready to enforce their lord's will. A young man serving in a military capacity, separate from the entourage that constituted a noble's familia or "household", might be termed a vavasor in documents.

== Civic patronage ==
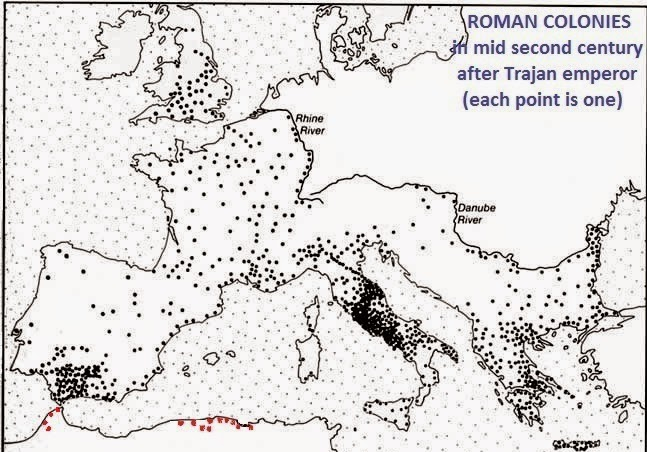
A map showing Roman colonies in the mid-2nd century

Several influential Romans, such as Caesar and Augustus, established client–patron relationships in conquered regions. This can be seen in Caesar’s relations with the Aedui of Gaul wherein he was able to restore their influence over the other Gallic tribes who were once their clients. Hereafter he was asked on several occasions to serve the duties of a patron by the Aedui and was thus regarded by many in Rome as the patron of the Aedui.

Augustus established colonies in all parts of the empire during his conquests which extended his influence to its furthest reaches. He also made many acts of kindness to the whole of Rome at large, including food and monetary handouts, as well as settling soldiers in new colonies that he sponsored, which indebted a great many people to him. Through these examples, Augustus altered the form of patronage to one that suited his ambitions for power, encouraging acts that would benefit Roman society over selfish interests. Although rare, it was possible for women to be patronesses.

Patronage and its many forms allowed for a minimal form of administration bound by personal relations between parties and thus in the late Republic patronage served as a model for ruling. Conquerors or governors abroad established personal ties as patron to whole communities, ties which then might be perpetuated as a family obligation. One such instance was the Marcelli's patronage of the Sicilians, as Claudius Marcellus had conquered Syracuse and Sicily.

Extending rights or citizenship to municipalities or provincial families was one way to add to the number of one's clients for political purposes, as Pompeius Strabo did among the Transpadanes. This form of patronage contributed to the new role created by Augustus as sole ruler after the collapse of the Republic, when he cultivated an image as the patron of the Empire as a whole.

Various professional and other corporations, such as collegia and sodalitates, awarded statutory titles such as patronus or pater patratus to benefactors.

== See also ==
- Euergetism
- Pietas (Duty)
- Jus patronatus

Client kingdoms and tribes

Chronologically:

- Hasmoneans: kings of Judea, the last of which were clients of the Roman republic
- Herod the Great of Judea and his descendants
- Ghassanids, the: client tribe of the Byzantine Empire
