= La deixa del geni grec =

Epic poem by Miquel Costa i Llobera

- Author: Miquel Costa i Llobera
- Language: Catalan
- Genre: Epic poetry, Romantic poetry
- Publication date: 1901
- Publication place: Spain
- Awards: Englantina d'or (1902)

La deixa del geni grec ("The Legacy of the Greek Genius") is a long epic poem by Miquel Costa i Llobera, which follows the adventures of a group of Greek sailors and their encounter with the mythical Sibyl Nuredduna in Talaiotic Mallorca. In 1902, the poem received a prize at the Jocs Florals of Barcelona.

The poem La deixa del geni grec was written between 1900 and 1901 in Pollença, inspired by his readings of Leconte de Lisle, André Chénier, and Homer (especially the Odyssey).

== Plot ==
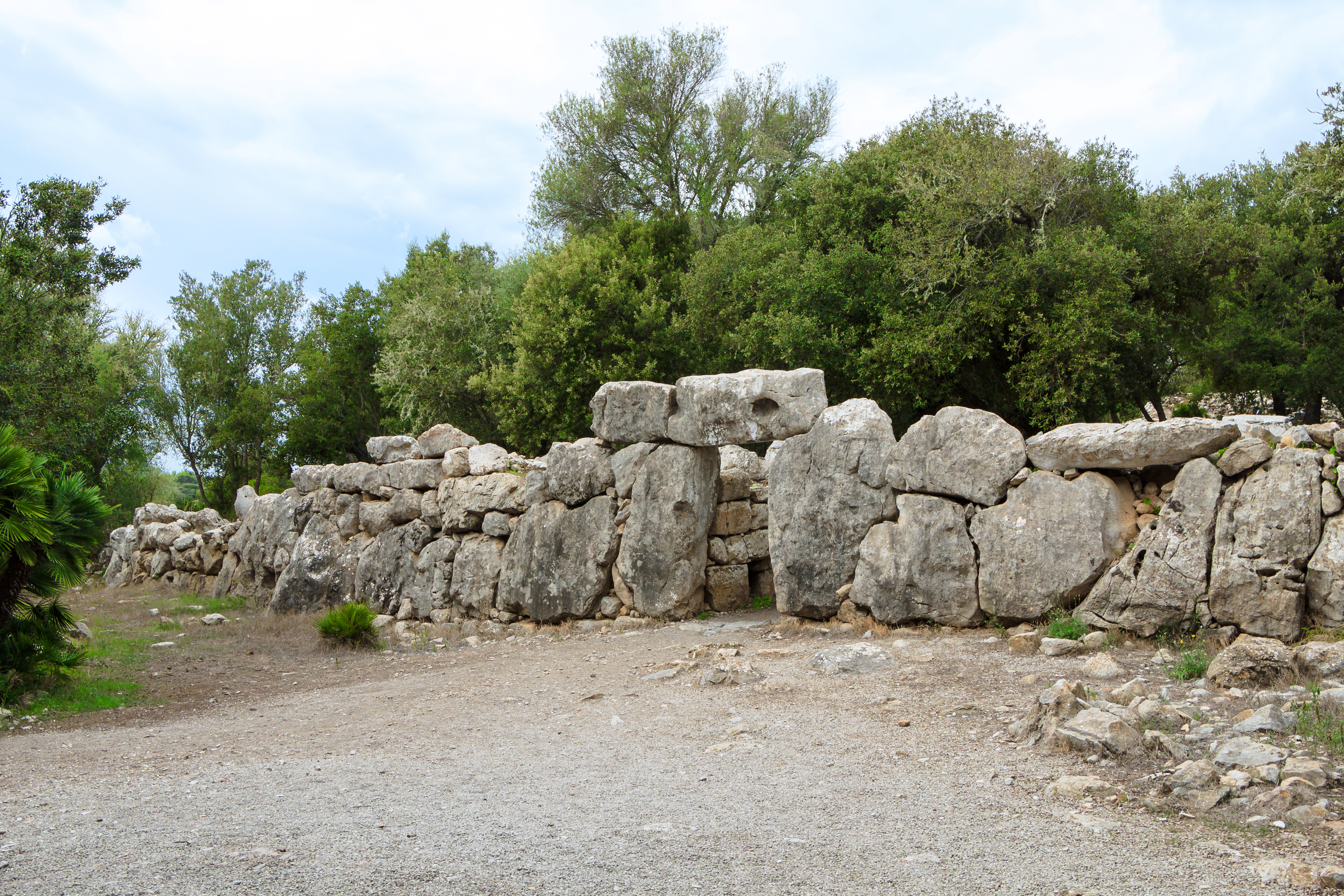
Entrance to the Talaiotic village of Ses Païsses

This long lyric-narrative poem recounts the misadventures of about ten Greek sailors who land on prehistoric Mallorca, at Bocchoris (near Port de Pollença). Travelling with them is a young rhapsode, Melesigenes, the alter ego of the poet Homer.

The Greeks are captured by a tribe of native Balearic slingers. On the verge of being sacrificed at the talaiots near the Coves d'Artà, the Mallorcan priestess Nuredduna, enchanted by the song of the young rhapsode Melesigenes, attempts to save him from death. Thus, while the sacrifice takes place at the altars of the talaiot, Melesigenes is locked inside the caves and escapes death. Later, he manages to evade the tribe's watch. In the urgency of his flight, however, Melesigenes forgets and leaves behind his rhapsode's lyre inside the cave.

This lyre becomes the legacy and inheritance of the Greek genius: a classicism that will fertilise popular culture and give rise to learned poetry.

== Metre and verses ==
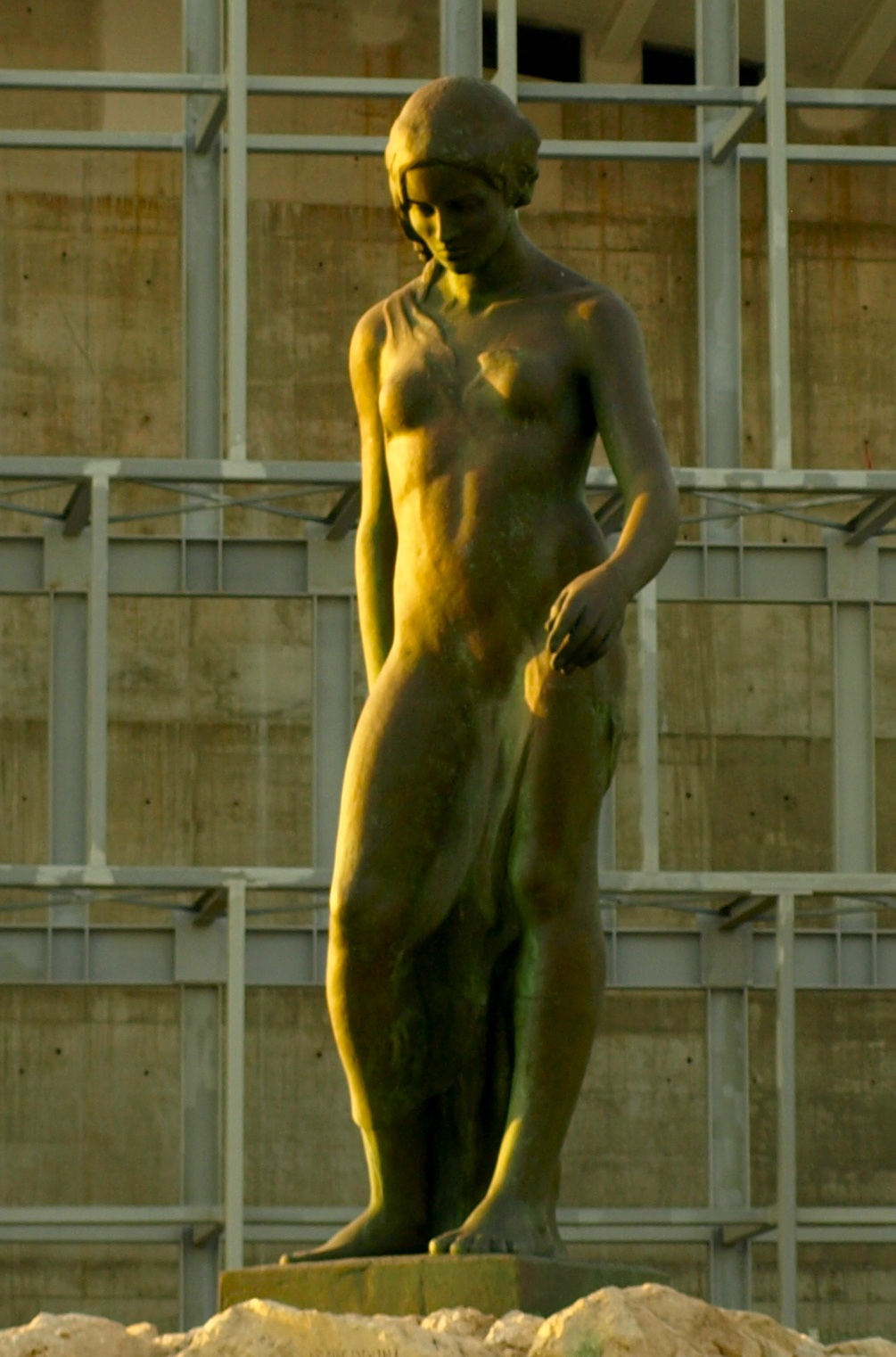
Nuredduna, sculpture by Remígia Caubet, on the Passeig Marítim of Palma.

The lyric-narrative poem consists of three parts and has a total of 642 alexandrine verses, paired or arranged into stanzas. It is the second-longest poem in Costa i Llobera's work. Its rhyme scheme is consonant.

== Legacy and reception ==
In November 1971, the Palma City Council decided to pay tribute to the poet on the fiftieth anniversary of his death. The municipal corporation commissioned the Mallorcan artist Remígia Caubet to create a sculpture and monument personified as Nuredduna.

The work Nuredduna (1947) is an opera in the Catalan language inspired by La deixa del geni grec, with music by Antoni Massana and a libretto by Miquel Forteza i Pinya.

The asteroid Nuredduna, belonging to the asteroid belt, a region of the Solar System located between the orbits of Mars and Jupiter, takes its name from the mythological figure created by the poet Costa i Llobera.
