= Nuredduna (character) =

Nuredduna is a character created by the poet Miquel Costa i Llobera. She is a sibyl from the Balearic Islands, and the heroine of the epic poem titled La deixa del geni grec ("The Legacy of the Greek Genius").

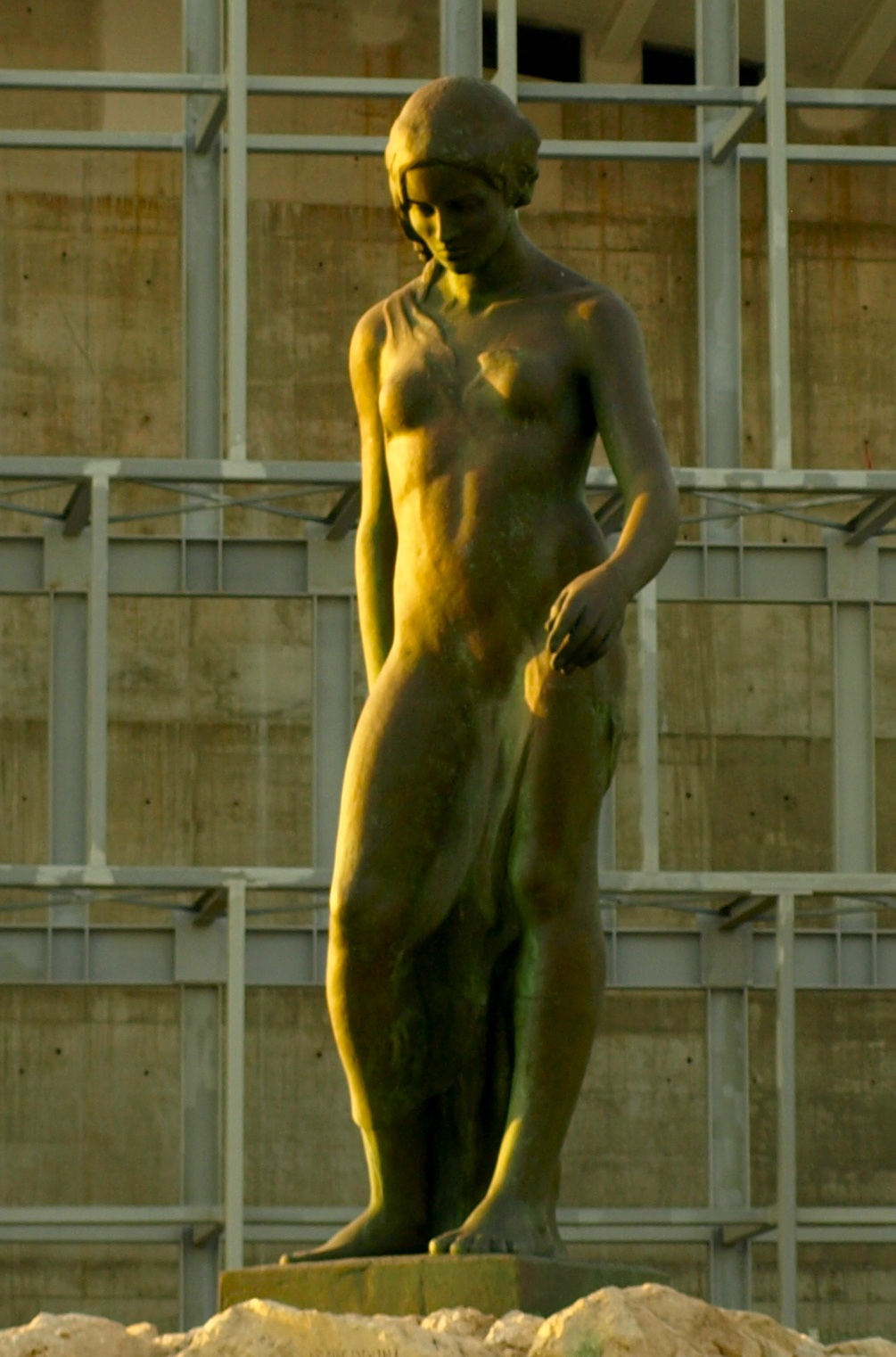
Statue of Nuredduna, in Palma de Mallorca.

== Etymology ==
The name Nuredduna was coined by Costa i Llobera, based on the word nur, which in the Middle East is associated with fire or light (نور).

== History ==
The lyrical-narrative poem La deixa del geni grec was written in 1900 in Pollença by the poet Miquel Costa i Llobera. This epic poem recounts the adventure of a group of Greeks who disembarked millennia ago in Mallorca, at Bocchoris, near the Port de Pollença. Among them travels a young rhapsode, Melesigeni, an alter ego of Homer. The narrative tells how these Greeks are captured by the native Balearic slinger tribes of the island, who plan to sacrifice them at the talaiots near the caves of Artà. One night, however, the Mallorcan priestess Nuredduna, in love with the young poet Melesigeni, decides to free him while the others are sacrificed to the gods. In the rush of their escape, Melesigeni forgets his lyre in the cave. Thus, this lyre becomes the legacy of the Greek spirit — a classicism that will enrich popular culture and inspire cultivated poetry.

== Legacy and impact ==
Nowadays, several streets and buildings in the Balearic Islands bear Nuredduna's name, including locations in Palma de Mallorca and Pollença.

In November 1971, the Palma City Council decided to pay tribute to the poet Costa i Llobera on the 50th anniversary of his death. The municipal corporation commissioned the Mallorcan artist Remigia Caubet to create a sculpture and monument dedicated to the poet. Thus, the artist made a sculpture of Nuredduna, which is located in Palma de Mallorca.

Nuredduna (1947) is an opera in the Catalan language, with music by Antoni Massana i Bertran and a libretto by Miquel Forteza i Pinya.

The asteroid (16852) Nuredduna, part of the asteroid belt located between the orbits of Mars and Jupiter, owes its name to this mythological character created by Costa i Llobera.
