= Tabula patronatus =

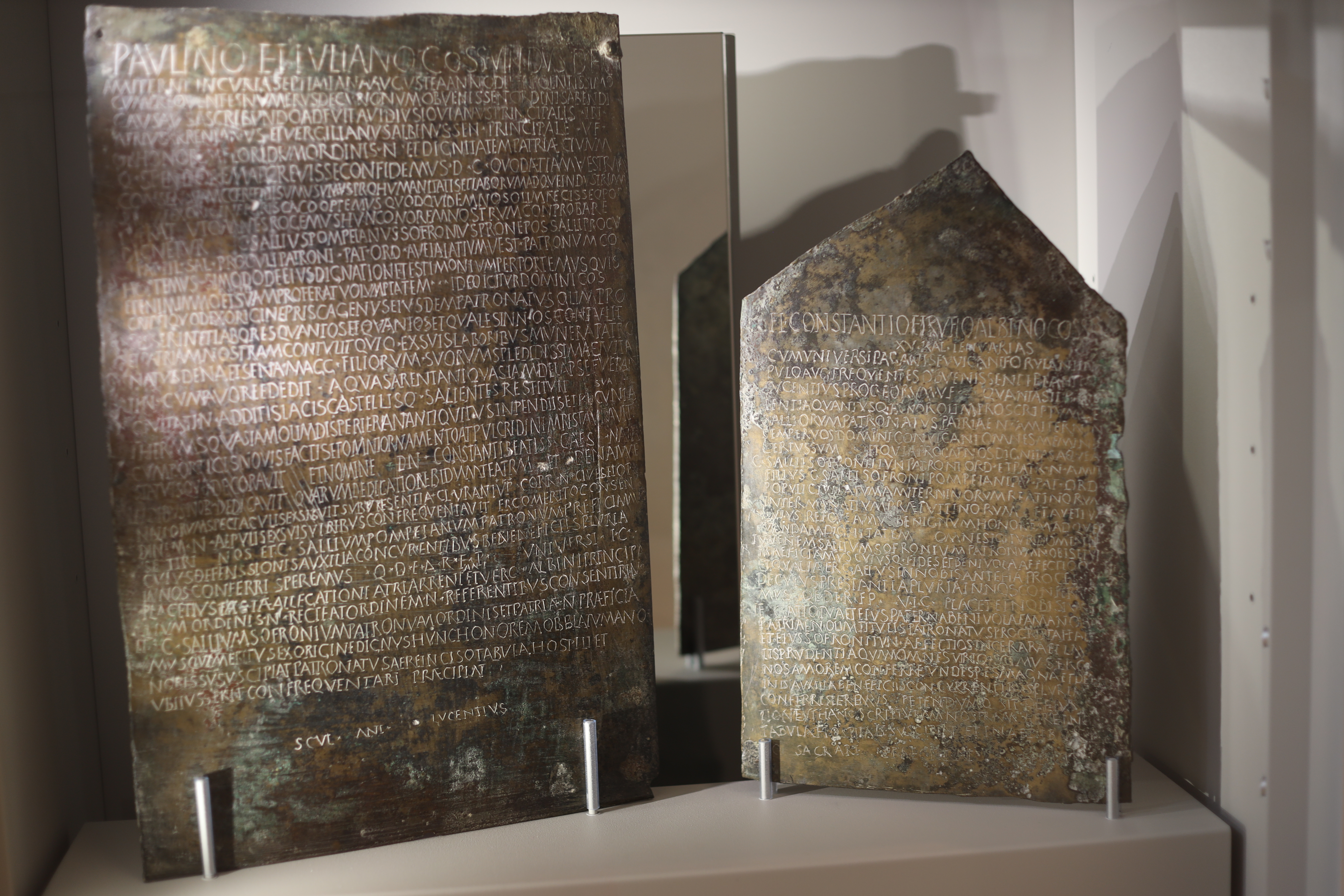
Tabulae patronatus from Amiternum

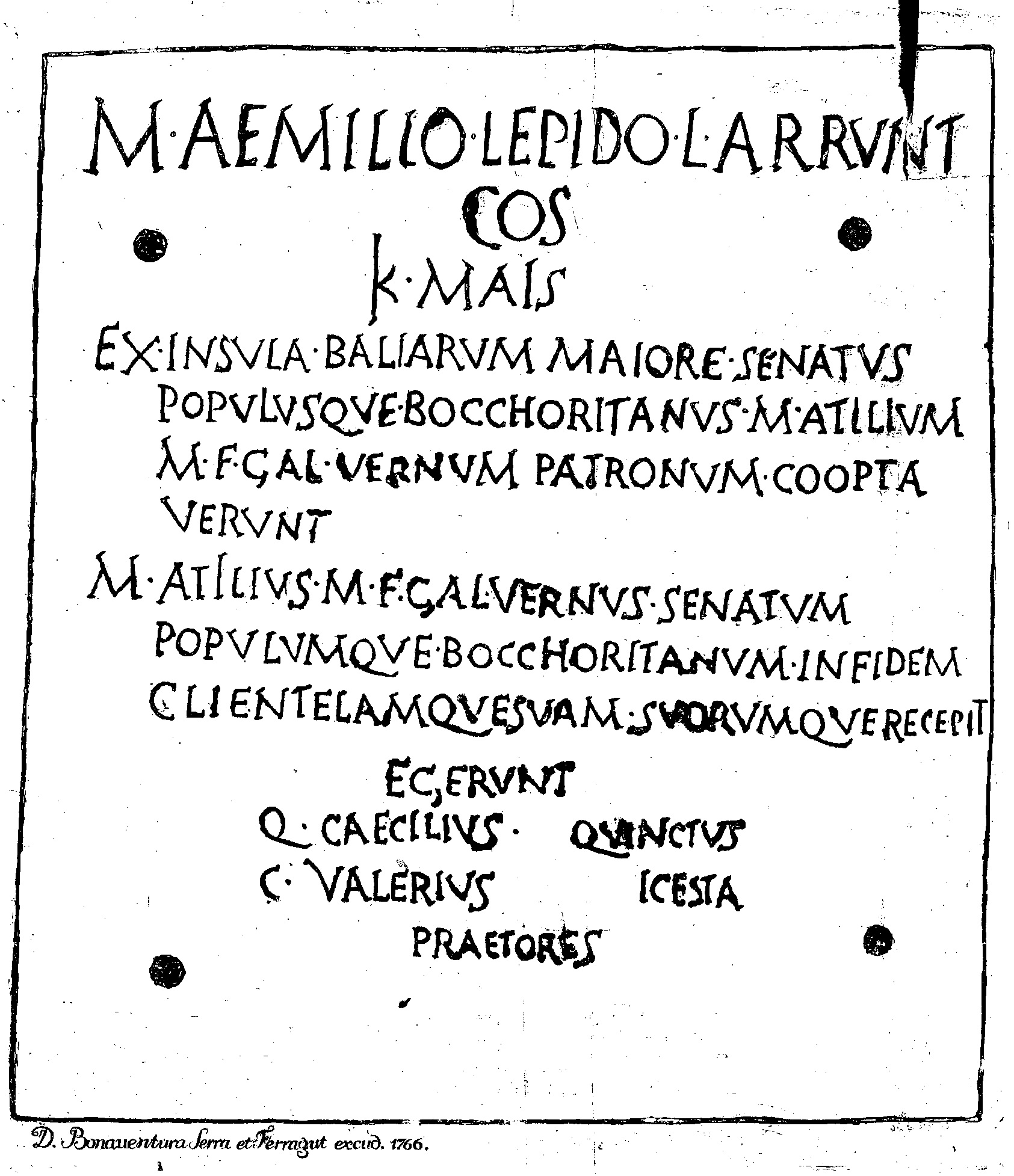
Transcription of a tabula patronatus from Bocchorus (AD 6)

In ancient Rome, a tabula patronatus was a tablet, usually bronze, displaying an official recognition that an individual was a municipal patron.

Patronage of a city was a political extension of the traditional relationship (clientela) between a patron (patronus or patrona) and client (cliens). The primary responsibilities of the patron of a town (municipium or colonia) were to advocate for local interests at Rome; to help negotiate legal disputes within the community, especially those that might arise from conflicts between local and Roman law; and to act as a benefactor in endowing public works, religious dedications and foundations, and entertainments. After the death of a patron, it was possible to transfer the agreement and produce another tabula.

The foundation charter published as the Lex Ursonensis included regulations on patronage. Not many patronage tablets have been found, most being unearthed in North Africa and Roman Spain. Five Hispanian tablets are known: two found in Bocchorus (10 BC/AD 6), another in Sasamón (AD 239), one with a pediment in Cañete de las Torres (AD 247), and another in Córdoba (AD 349). In Hispania, the institution of patronage seems to have been linked with hospitium, the Latin name for traditional "guest-host" relations evidenced for pre-Roman Hispania in the form of hospitality tokens (tesserae hospitales or hospitii).

An inscription found in Rome in AD 222 refers to the patronage of Colonia Clunia Sulpicia.

== Sources ==
- Abascal, Juan Manuel (2003). "La recepción de la cultura epigráfica romana en Hispania" (PDF). La adaptación de las sociedades ibéricas a los modelos romanos.
- Amorós, Lluís (1952). "Una nueva Tabula Patronatus de Bocchoris". Bolletí de la Societat Arqueològica Lul·liana. 30 (1): 632–637.
- Lomas, Kathryn (1996). Roman Italy 338 BC–AD 200: A Sourcebook. Routledge.

Media related to Tabulae patronatus at Wikimedia Commons
