= 16525 Shumarinaiko =

Main-belt asteroid binary

Discovery
- Discovered by: K. Endate; K. Watanabe
- Discovery site: Kitami Obs.
- Discovery date: 14 February 1991

Designations
- Named after: Lake Shumarinai (Japanese lake)
- Alternative designations: 1991 CU_{2} · 1996 TE_{51}
- Minor planet category: main-belt · (inner); Nysa–Polana complex

Orbital characteristics
- Epoch 4 September 2017 (JD 2458000.5)
- Uncertainty parameter 0
- Observation arc: 67.29 yr (24,578 days)
- Aphelion: 2.7341 AU
- Perihelion: 2.0648 AU
- Semi-major axis: 2.3995 AU
- Eccentricity: 0.1395
- Orbital period (sidereal): 3.72 yr (1,358 days)
- Mean anomaly: 30.750°
- Mean motion: 0° 15^{m} 54.72^{s} / day
- Inclination: 2.4279°
- Longitude of ascending node: 7.6547°
- Argument of perihelion: 180.19°
- Known satellites: 1 (D: 0.83 km; P: 14.409 h) (Note: Brian D. Warner (2013) Lightcurve plot of 16525 Shumarinaiko, Palmer Divide Observatory: rotation period of 2.5932±0.0003 hours with a brightness amplitude of 0.08±0.01 mag. Quality code of 3. Secondary plot with an orbital period of 14.409±0.005 hours. Summary figures for (16525) Shumarinaiko at LCDB)

Physical characteristics
- Dimensions: 5.253±0.146 km 5.66 km (calculated)
- Synodic rotation period: 2.5932±0.0003 h 2.6425±0.0006 h (poor); 8.8±0.3 h (poor)
- Geometric albedo: 0.20 (assumed); 0.306±0.033
- Spectral type: S (assumed)
- Absolute magnitude (H): 13.3 · 13.6 · 14.37±0.56

16525 Shumarinaiko (provisional designation 1991 CU_{2}) is a binary asteroid in the inner region of the asteroid belt, approximately 5 kilometers in diameter. It was discovered on 14 February 1991, by Japanese astronomers Kin Endate and Kazuro Watanabe at the Kitami Observatory on the island of Hokkaidō in northern Japan. The asteroid was named after the Japanese Lake Shumarinai. Its sub-kilometer sized minor-planet moon was discovered in 2013.

== Orbit and classification ==
Shumarinaiko is a member of the Nysa–Polana complex, a collection of overlapping asteroid families in the inner main asteroid belt near the Kirkwood gap (3:1 orbital resonance with Jupiter), a depleted zone that separates the central main belt. It orbits the Sun at a distance of 2.1–2.7 AU once every 3 years and 9 months (1,358 days). Its orbit has an eccentricity of 0.14 and an inclination of 2° with respect to the ecliptic.

The body's observation arc begins with a precovery from the Digitized Sky Survey. It was taken at Palomar Observatory in March 1950, almost 41 years prior to the asteroid's official discovery observation at Kitami in 1991.

== Physical characteristics ==
Shumarinaiko is an assumed stony S-type asteroid.

=== Rotation period ===
In January 2013, a rotational lightcurve of Shumarinaiko was obtained from photometric observations by Brian Warner at the Palmer Divide Observatory (716) in Colorado, and Dan Coley at DanHenge Observatory (U80) in California. Analysis of the bimodal lightcurve gave a well-defined rotation period of 2.5932 hours with a brightness amplitude of 0.08 magnitude (U=3), superseding the results from previous observations that gave a period of 2.6425 and 8.8 hours, respectively (U=1/1). A low brightness amplitude typically indicates that the body is rather spherical in shape.

=== Moon ===
During the photometric observation by Warner and Coley in January 2013 (see above), mutual occultation and eclipsing events revealed that Shumarinaiko is a synchronous binary asteroid with an elongated minor-planet moon in orbit. The satellite, provisionally designated S/2013 (16525) 1, seems to be tidally locked to its orbital period of 14.409 hours. It measures least 16% of its primary (D_{s}/D_{p} of <0.16±0.02), which translates into a diameter of approximately 830 meters. There are more than 100 binary asteroids known to exist in the asteroid belt.

=== Diameter and albedo ===
According to the survey carried out by the NEOWISE mission of NASA's Wide-field Infrared Survey Explorer, Shumarinaiko measures 5.253 kilometers in diameter and its surface has an albedo of 0.306, while the Collaborative Asteroid Lightcurve Link assumes a standard albedo for stony asteroids of 0.20 and calculates a diameter of 5.66 kilometers based on an absolute magnitude of 13.6.

== Naming ==
This minor planet was named after Lake Shumarinai. The lake is located within the Shumarinai Prefectural Natural Park in northern Hokkaidō, Japan. Artificially created to generate hydroelectricity in the 1940s, it is now known for its scenery. The official naming citation was published by the Minor Planet Center on 15 December 2005 (M.P.C. 55722).
