= Shumarinai Prefectural Natural Park =

Natural park in Hokkaido, Japan

- 朱鞠内道立自然公園
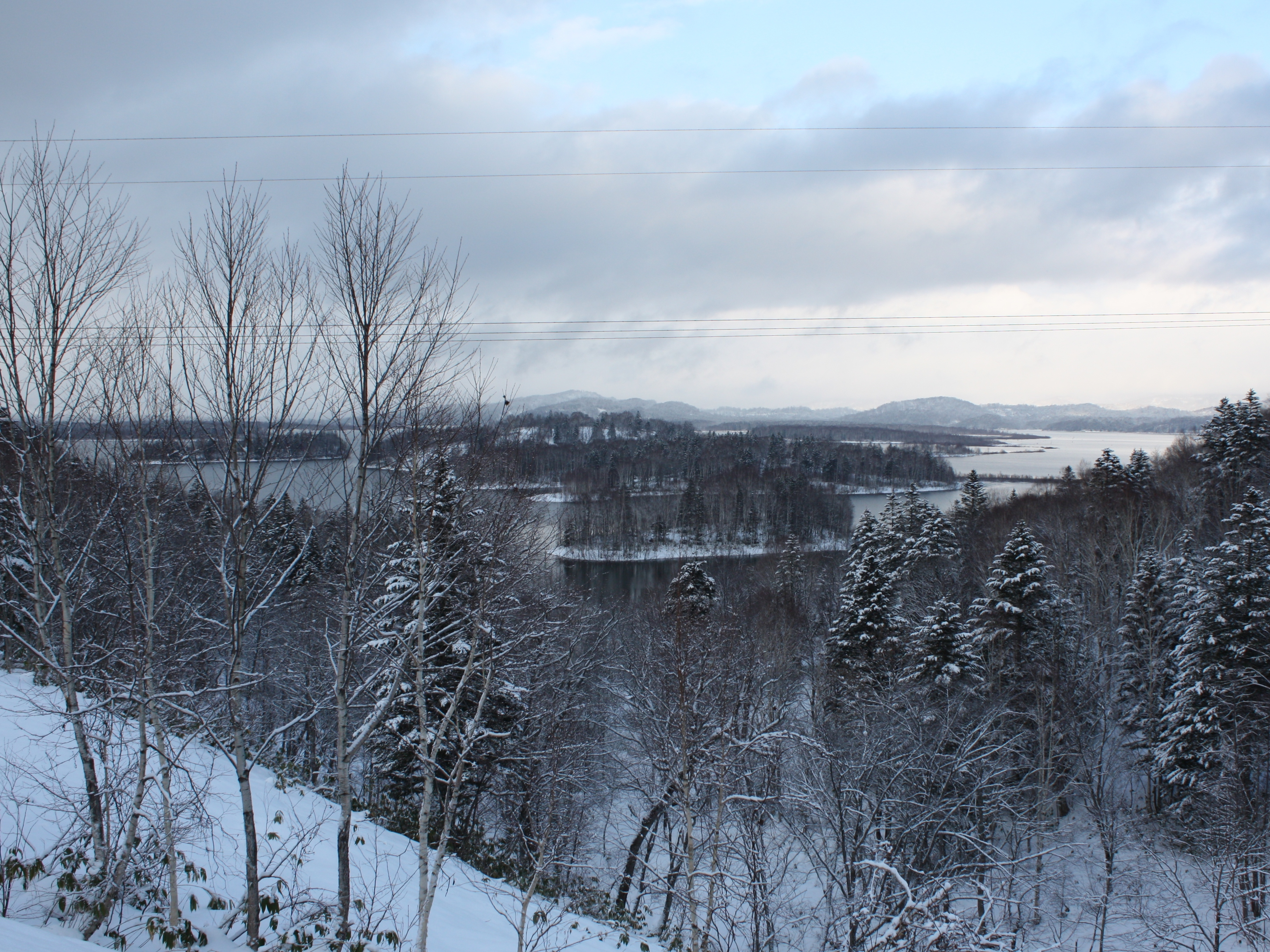
- Lake Shumarinai
- Interactive map of Shumarinai Prefectural Natural Park
- Location: Hokkaidō, Japan
- Area: 137.67 km^{2} (53.15 sq mi)
- Established: 30 April 1974

Shumarinai Prefectural Natural Park (朱鞠内道立自然公園, Shumarinai dōritsu shizen kōen) is a Prefectural Natural Park in northern Hokkaidō, Japan. Established in 1974, the park spans the municipalities of Enbetsu, Haboro, Horokanai, and Shibetsu.

Lake Shumarinai was created artificially in 1943, after which asteroid 16525 Shumarinaiko was named.

== Climate ==
Climate data for Shumarinai, elevation 255 m (837 ft), (1991–2020 normals, extremes 1978–2017)
Month	Jan	Feb	Mar	Apr	May	Jun	Jul	Aug	Sep	Oct	Nov	Dec	Year
Record high °C (°F)	5.2 (41.4)	8.9 (48.0)	11.3 (52.3)	23.6 (74.5)	28.8 (83.8)	34.3 (93.7)	31.7 (89.1)	33.9 (93.0)	30.4 (86.7)	22.6 (72.7)	18.3 (64.9)	9.5 (49.1)	34.3 (93.7)
Mean daily maximum °C (°F)	−4.4 (24.1)	−3.4 (25.9)	1.0 (33.8)	7.5 (45.5)	15.4 (59.7)	20.5 (68.9)	23.9 (75.0)	24.2 (75.6)	19.9 (67.8)	12.9 (55.2)	4.2 (39.6)	−2.4 (27.7)	9.9 (49.8)
Daily mean °C (°F)	−9.1 (15.6)	−8.6 (16.5)	−4.0 (24.8)	2.3 (36.1)	8.7 (47.7)	14.1 (57.4)	18.2 (64.8)	18.6 (65.5)	13.8 (56.8)	7.1 (44.8)	0.5 (32.9)	−5.9 (21.4)	4.7 (40.5)
Mean daily minimum °C (°F)	−15.4 (4.3)	−15.8 (3.6)	−10.6 (12.9)	−3.2 (26.2)	2.1 (35.8)	8.1 (46.6)	13.1 (55.6)	13.9 (57.0)	8.4 (47.1)	1.8 (35.2)	−3.2 (26.2)	−10.6 (12.9)	−0.9 (30.4)
Record low °C (°F)	−35.8 (−32.4)	−33.6 (−28.5)	−33.2 (−27.8)	−18.0 (−0.4)	−6.2 (20.8)	−2.3 (27.9)	1.7 (35.1)	2.7 (36.9)	−1.6 (29.1)	−7.9 (17.8)	−21.0 (−5.8)	−31.5 (−24.7)	−35.8 (−32.4)
Average precipitation mm (inches)	136.6 (5.38)	109.8 (4.32)	100.6 (3.96)	72.4 (2.85)	81.4 (3.20)	76.4 (3.01)	153.9 (6.06)	180.2 (7.09)	187.3 (7.37)	177.6 (6.99)	213.2 (8.39)	207.7 (8.18)	1,698.8 (66.88)
Average snowfall cm (inches)	270 (106)	220 (87)	180 (71)	59 (23)	6 (2.4)	0 (0)	0 (0)	0 (0)	0 (0)	10 (3.9)	179 (70)	343 (135)	1,247 (491)
Average extreme snow depth cm (inches)	198 (78)	225 (89)	227 (89)	177 (70)	54 (21)	0 (0)	0 (0)	0 (0)	0 (0)	5 (2.0)	66 (26)	157 (62)	235 (93)
Average precipitation days (≥ 1.0 mm)	23.2	19.3	18.5	13.1	11.9	9.6	11.1	12.5	14.9	17.6	22.1	26.2	200.1
Average snowy days (≥ 3.0 cm)	22.4	19.0	17.4	7.1	0.8	0	0	0	0	1.2	13.3	24.1	104.4
Mean monthly sunshine hours	44.0	60.9	101.0	152.6	196.7	166.0	148.9	144.4	142.0	106.9	42.7	23.3	1,328.5
Source: JMA

== See also ==
- National Parks of Japan
