= Bocchoris (city) =

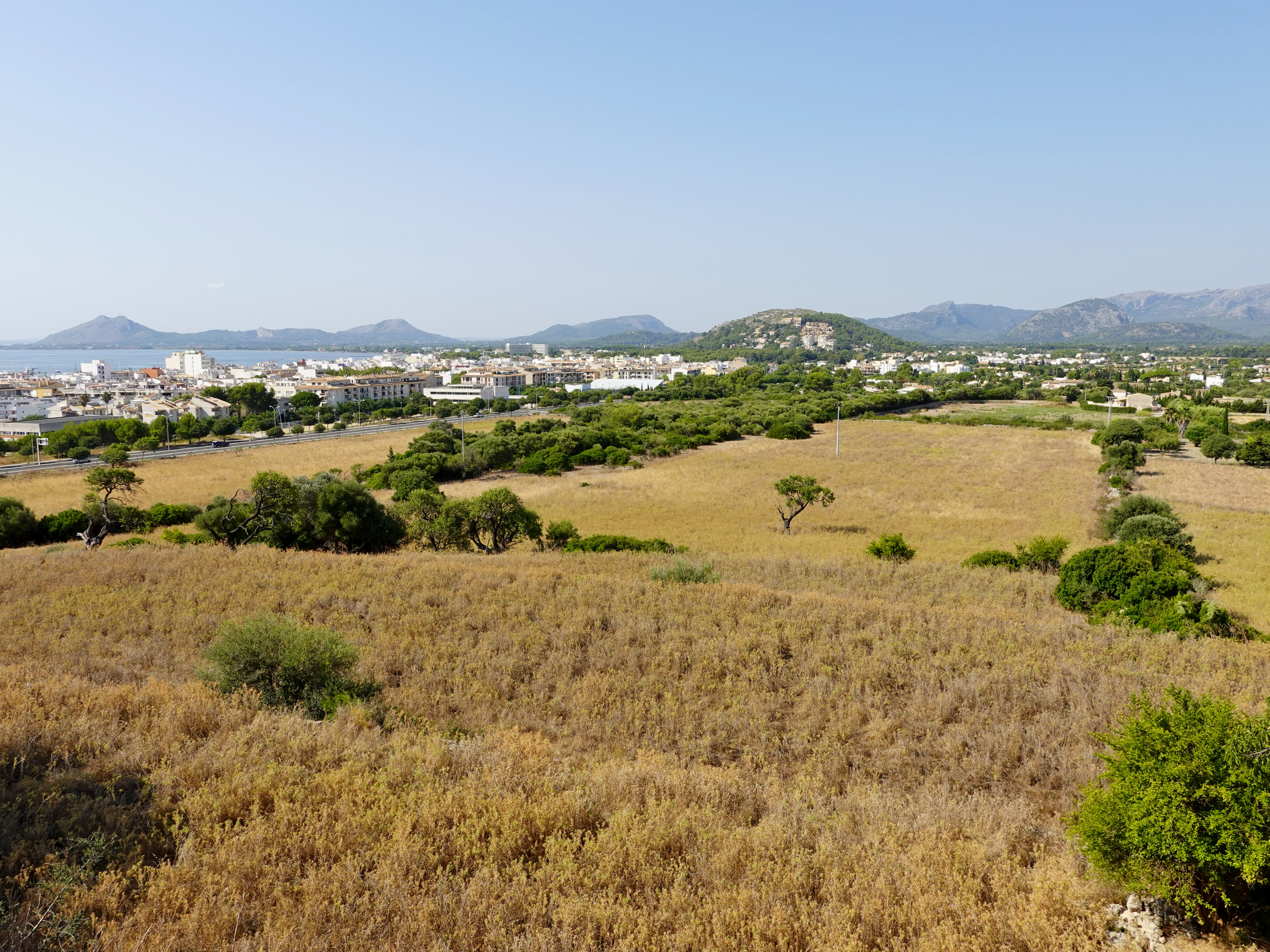
The site of Pedret de Bóquer, which preserves the prehistoric enclosure of Bocchoris (in the fields on the right, visible at the distance)

Bocchoris (also known as Bocchor, Bocchorum, and Oppidum Bochoritanum) was an ancient city in northern Majorca (Balearic Islands, Spain), dating back to pre-Roman times. It was one of the oldest settlements in Majorca, tracing its origins to the Bronze Age. After the Second Punic War or the Roman conquest of the Balearic Islands by consul Quintus Caecilius Metellus, it was a foederatus (federated city to Rome), as recorded by Pliny the Elder. Little is known about its history, despite the recovery of two complete tabulae patronatus in the area.

== Location ==
Bocchoris lay near the current town of Port de Pollença, near the coast to the right of the road from Port de Pollença to Pollença, at the entrance of Boquer Valley.

The city dates back to c. 1400 BC, when the inhabitants lived about 1,000 metres north in navetas in the ridge of the valley, in what has been considered to be the largest Bronze Age settlement on the island. A long stretch of the Iron Age wall is still visible in what is now flat farmland at the Pedret de Boquer.

== Remains ==
The site is known for containing one of the largest Iron Age fortifications in Majorca. A gate was preserved, but disappeared at some point during the 1960s. Several other large enclosed settlements have been detected in the Bay of Pollença, and could have been confederated together with Boquer to make the Civitas Bocchoritana.

The surrounding area was excavated between 2001 and 2008, but the Iron Age town remains unexplored. Remains of fallow deer, introduced on the island by the Romans, were documented during these excavations.

== Historiography ==
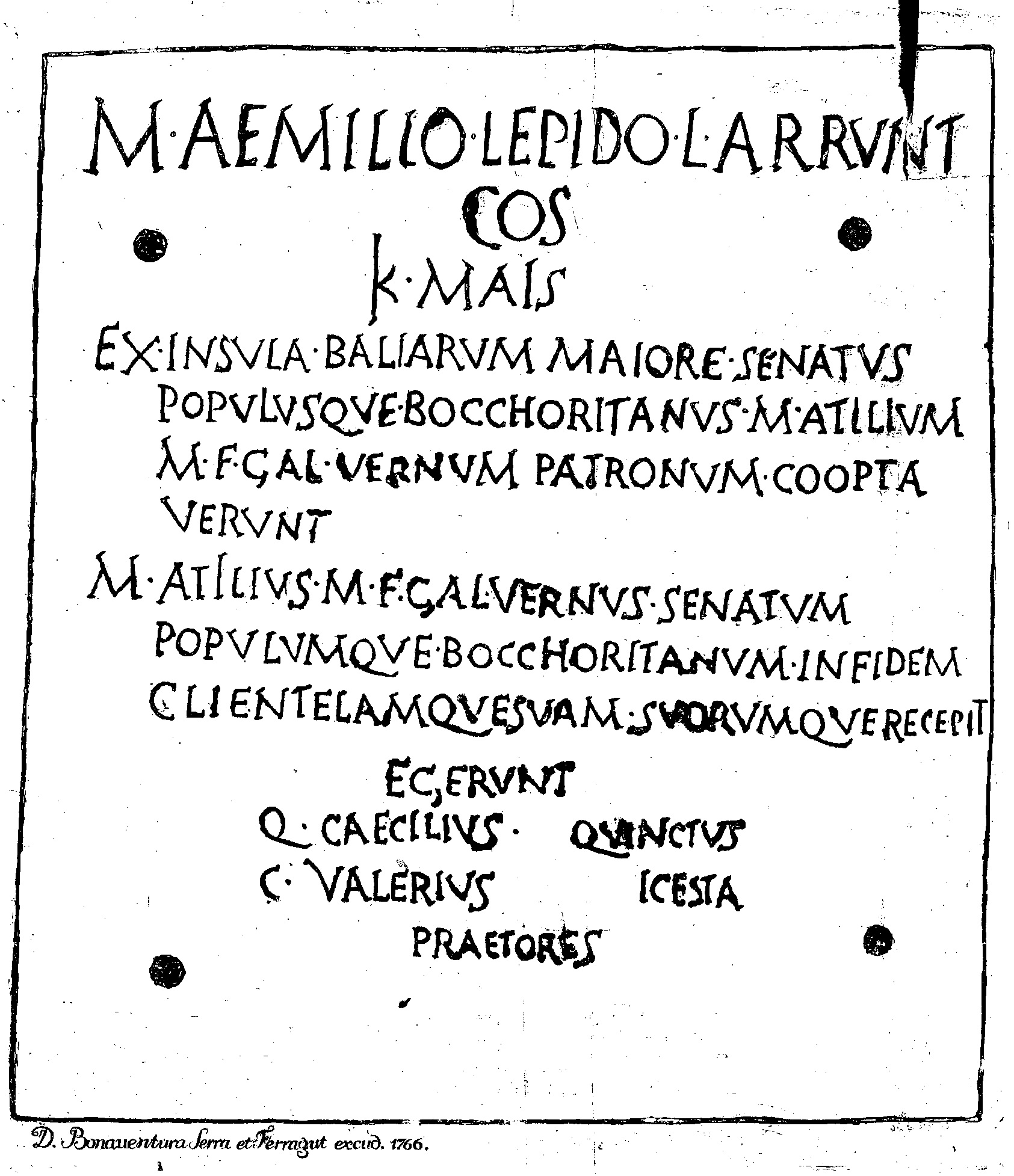
A tabula patronatus from Bocchorus (AD 6).

The Civitas Bocchoritana, known historiographically as Bocchoris, is unique in the island of Majorca. Evidence that it once was a federated city is sensu stricto confirmed by juridic epigraphy, in the form of two different tabulae patronatus. Pliny the Elder also listed Bocchoris among the federated cities, in his book Naturalis Historia, III, 77–78 in the 1st century BC:

The Baleares, so formidable in war with their slingers, have received from the Greeks the name of Gymnasiæ. The larger island is 100 miles in length, and 475 in circumference. It has the following towns: Palma and Pollentia, enjoying the rights of Roman citizens, Guium and Tucis, with Latin rights; and Bocchorum was a federate town.

Near the ruins of Boquer, two bronze inscriptions were found, dating back to the years 10 BC and AD 6. One inscription, found in the Bay of Pollença in 1951, and dating to 10 BC, mainly stated that Bocchoris' patron was Marcus Crassus, Roman consul in 14 BC. The whole text in Latin, as written in the inscription, is as follows:

(Iullo Ant)onio Fabio Africano | a(nte) d(iem) XVII k(alendas) Apriles | Civitas Bochoritana ex | insula Baliarum Maiorum | patronum cooptavit M. | Crassum Frugi leiberos | posterosque eius. | M. Crassus Frugi eos in | suam suorumque | clientelam recepit. Egerunt C. Coelius C. F. et | C. Caecilius T. F. legati

The other tabula patronatus was discovered much earlier, in 1765. According to this bronze inscription, dating to 6 AD, the Senate and the people of Bocchoris selected by mutual consent the Roman Senator Marcus Atilius Vernus as their patron. In Latin, it says:

M. Aemilio Lepido, L. Arruntio | co(n)s(ulibus) k(alendis) Mais. | Ex insula Baliarum Maiore senatus | populusque Bocchoritanus M. Atilium M. F. Gal(eria) Vernum patronum coopata | verunt | M. Atilius M. F. Gal(eria) Vernus senatum | populusque Bochoritanum in fidem | clientelamque suam suorumque recepit. | Egerunt Q. Caecilius Quintus | C. Valerius Icesta praetores

== Etymology ==
Very little is known about the origin of the word Bocchoris and whether the name of the city was actually Bocchor, Bocchoris or Bocchorum. The name is still conserved in its Catalan variant, Boquer, which denominates the area around the current Boquer Valley in Port de Pollença.

The poet Miquel Costa i Llobera mentioned in his epic poem La deixa del geni grec, based on the legend of Nuredduna, that the Egyptians founded Bocchoris millennia ago, with its name linked to Bakenranef. This interpretation was conveyed to him by his friend, archaeologist Fidel Fita.
