= List of minor planets: 16001–17000 =

The following is a partial list of minor planets, running from minor-planet number 16001 through 17000, inclusive. The primary data for this and other partial lists is based on JPL's "Small-Body Orbital Elements" and data available from the Minor Planet Center. Critical list information is also provided by the MPC, unless otherwise specified from Lowell Observatory. A detailed description of the table's columns and additional sources are given on the main page including a complete list of every page in this series, and a statistical break-up on the dynamical classification of minor planets.

Also see the summary list of all named bodies in numerical and alphabetical order, and the corresponding naming citations for the number range of this particular list. New namings may only be added to this list after official publication, as the preannouncement of names is condemned by the Working Group for Small Bodies Nomenclature of the International Astronomical Union.

Near-Earth obj.	MBA (inner)	MBA (outer)	Centaur
Mars-crosser	MBA (middle)	Jupiter trojan	Trans-Neptunian obj.
Unclassified

== 16001–16100 ==
Designation			Discovery			Properties		Ref
Permanent	Provisional	Named after	Date	Site	Discoverer(s)	Category	Diam.	Ref
16001	1999 AY_{21}	—	January 15, 1999	Višnjan Observatory	K. Korlević	HYG	7.8 km	MPC · JPL
16002 Bertin	1999 AM_{24}	Bertin	January 15, 1999	Caussols	ODAS	·	7.1 km	MPC · JPL
16003	1999 BX_{2}	—	January 19, 1999	Oizumi	T. Kobayashi	·	6.6 km	MPC · JPL
16004	1999 BZ_{3}	—	January 20, 1999	Višnjan Observatory	K. Korlević	·	3.2 km	MPC · JPL
16005	1999 BP_{7}	—	January 21, 1999	Višnjan Observatory	K. Korlević	BAR	3.6 km	MPC · JPL
16006	1999 BJ_{9}	—	January 22, 1999	Višnjan Observatory	K. Korlević	NYS	3.7 km	MPC · JPL
16007 Kaasalainen	1999 BC_{11}	Kaasalainen	January 20, 1999	Caussols	ODAS	·	6.3 km	MPC · JPL
16008	1999 CV	—	February 5, 1999	Oizumi	T. Kobayashi	(883)	2.4 km	MPC · JPL
16009	1999 CM_{8}	—	February 13, 1999	Oizumi	T. Kobayashi	·	10 km	MPC · JPL
16010	1999 CG_{14}	—	February 13, 1999	Višnjan Observatory	K. Korlević	EOS	9.0 km	MPC · JPL
16011	1999 CM_{16}	—	February 6, 1999	Višnjan Observatory	K. Korlević	·	4.6 km	MPC · JPL
16012 Jamierubin	1999 CG_{19}	Jamierubin	February 10, 1999	Socorro	LINEAR	·	6.9 km	MPC · JPL
16013 Schmidgall	1999 CX_{38}	Schmidgall	February 10, 1999	Socorro	LINEAR	·	3.5 km	MPC · JPL
16014 Sinha	1999 CB_{47}	Sinha	February 10, 1999	Socorro	LINEAR	·	4.2 km	MPC · JPL
16015 Snell	1999 CK_{47}	Snell	February 10, 1999	Socorro	LINEAR	THM	16 km	MPC · JPL
16016 Boylan	1999 CB_{54}	Boylan	February 10, 1999	Socorro	LINEAR	·	3.6 km	MPC · JPL
16017 Street	1999 CX_{65}	Street	February 12, 1999	Socorro	LINEAR	·	5.3 km	MPC · JPL
16018	1999 CJ_{67}	—	February 12, 1999	Socorro	LINEAR	slow	21 km	MPC · JPL
16019 Edwardsu	1999 CL_{69}	Edwardsu	February 12, 1999	Socorro	LINEAR	·	5.7 km	MPC · JPL
16020 Tevelde	1999 CA_{76}	Tevelde	February 12, 1999	Socorro	LINEAR	·	2.4 km	MPC · JPL
16021 Caseyvaughn	1999 CG_{81}	Caseyvaughn	February 12, 1999	Socorro	LINEAR	V	2.6 km	MPC · JPL
16022 Wissnergross	1999 CJ_{86}	Wissnergross	February 10, 1999	Socorro	LINEAR	NYS	2.6 km	MPC · JPL
16023 Alisonyee	1999 CV_{93}	Alisonyee	February 10, 1999	Socorro	LINEAR	·	3.9 km	MPC · JPL
16024	1999 CT_{101}	—	February 10, 1999	Socorro	LINEAR	MAR	7.2 km	MPC · JPL
16025	1999 CA_{104}	—	February 12, 1999	Socorro	LINEAR	·	4.3 km	MPC · JPL
16026 Victoriapidgeon	1999 CM_{118}	Victoriapidgeon	February 13, 1999	Socorro	LINEAR	·	2.7 km	MPC · JPL
16027	1999 DV_{1}	—	February 18, 1999	Haleakala	NEAT	·	4.5 km	MPC · JPL
16028 Anushree	1999 DC_{6}	Anushree	February 17, 1999	Socorro	LINEAR	·	5.5 km	MPC · JPL
16029	1999 DQ_{6}	—	February 20, 1999	Socorro	LINEAR	·	21 km	MPC · JPL
16030	1999 FS_{3}	—	March 19, 1999	High Point	D. K. Chesney	·	6.7 km	MPC · JPL
16031	1999 FJ_{10}	—	March 20, 1999	King City, Ontario Observatory	Sandness, R. G.	THM	12 km	MPC · JPL
16032	1999 FU_{30}	—	March 19, 1999	Socorro	LINEAR	EOS	7.5 km	MPC · JPL
16033	1999 FT_{32}	—	March 24, 1999	Višnjan Observatory	K. Korlević	KOR	7.7 km	MPC · JPL
16034 Prechoudhary	1999 FW_{32}	Prechoudhary	March 24, 1999	Socorro	LINEAR	·	4.2 km	MPC · JPL
16035 Sasandford	1999 FX_{32}	Sasandford	March 24, 1999	Anderson Mesa	LONEOS	·	22 km	MPC · JPL
16036 Moroz	1999 GV_{8}	Moroz	April 10, 1999	Anderson Mesa	LONEOS	·	10 km	MPC · JPL
16037 Sheehan	1999 GX_{8}	Sheehan	April 10, 1999	Anderson Mesa	LONEOS	·	14 km	MPC · JPL
16038	1999 GD_{18}	—	April 15, 1999	Socorro	LINEAR	EOS	12 km	MPC · JPL
16039 Zeglin	1999 GH_{18}	Zeglin	April 15, 1999	Socorro	LINEAR	THM	12 km	MPC · JPL
16040	1999 GN_{18}	—	April 15, 1999	Socorro	LINEAR	EOS	7.6 km	MPC · JPL
16041	1999 GM_{19}	—	April 15, 1999	Socorro	LINEAR	EOS	14 km	MPC · JPL
16042	1999 GA_{20}	—	April 15, 1999	Socorro	LINEAR	AGN	6.0 km	MPC · JPL
16043 Yichenzhang	1999 GP_{23}	Yichenzhang	April 6, 1999	Socorro	LINEAR	·	3.6 km	MPC · JPL
16044 Kurtbachmann	1999 GW_{24}	Kurtbachmann	April 6, 1999	Socorro	LINEAR	KOR	4.2 km	MPC · JPL
16045	1999 HU_{2}	—	April 22, 1999	Xinglong	SCAP	·	14 km	MPC · JPL
16046 Gregnorman	1999 JK	Gregnorman	May 5, 1999	Reedy Creek	J. Broughton	·	14 km	MPC · JPL
16047	1999 JG_{10}	—	May 8, 1999	Catalina	CSS	EOS	7.1 km	MPC · JPL
16048 Eddiedai	1999 JU_{23}	Eddiedai	May 10, 1999	Socorro	LINEAR	·	9.7 km	MPC · JPL
16049 D'Amore	1999 JS_{32}	D'Amore	May 10, 1999	Socorro	LINEAR	KOR	6.1 km	MPC · JPL
16050	1999 JN_{35}	—	May 10, 1999	Socorro	LINEAR	THM	12 km	MPC · JPL
16051 Bernero	1999 JF_{36}	Bernero	May 10, 1999	Socorro	LINEAR	·	7.0 km	MPC · JPL
16052	1999 JX_{36}	—	May 10, 1999	Socorro	LINEAR	·	8.1 km	MPC · JPL
16053 Brennan	1999 JA_{40}	Brennan	May 10, 1999	Socorro	LINEAR	KOR	4.2 km	MPC · JPL
16054	1999 JP_{55}	—	May 10, 1999	Socorro	LINEAR	·	15 km	MPC · JPL
16055 Dellisanti	1999 JQ_{56}	Dellisanti	May 10, 1999	Socorro	LINEAR	GEF	5.2 km	MPC · JPL
16056	1999 JN_{75}	—	May 6, 1999	Socorro	LINEAR	MAR	5.7 km	MPC · JPL
16057	1999 JO_{75}	—	May 6, 1999	Socorro	LINEAR	ADE	13 km	MPC · JPL
16058 Doshi	1999 JP_{75}	Doshi	May 6, 1999	Socorro	LINEAR	·	5.4 km	MPC · JPL
16059 Marybuda	1999 JV_{86}	Marybuda	May 12, 1999	Socorro	LINEAR	·	11 km	MPC · JPL
16060 Dahliadry	1999 JZ_{89}	Dahliadry	May 12, 1999	Socorro	LINEAR	EOS	6.0 km	MPC · JPL
16061	1999 JQ_{117}	—	May 13, 1999	Socorro	LINEAR	·	12 km	MPC · JPL
16062 Buncher	1999 NR_{36}	Buncher	July 14, 1999	Socorro	LINEAR	·	7.4 km	MPC · JPL
16063	1999 NV_{36}	—	July 14, 1999	Socorro	LINEAR	·	3.0 km	MPC · JPL
16064 Davidharvey	1999 RH_{27}	Davidharvey	September 5, 1999	Catalina	CSS	AMO +1km · slow	4.1 km	MPC · JPL
16065 Borel	1999 RE_{35}	Borel	September 11, 1999	Prescott	P. G. Comba	·	2.7 km	MPC · JPL
16066 Richardbressler	1999 RN_{39}	Richardbressler	September 8, 1999	Catalina	CSS	EOS	12 km	MPC · JPL
16067 Brandonfan	1999 RA_{47}	Brandonfan	September 7, 1999	Socorro	LINEAR	·	10 km	MPC · JPL
16068 Citron	1999 RN_{86}	Citron	September 7, 1999	Socorro	LINEAR	·	4.4 km	MPC · JPL
16069 Marshafolger	1999 RS_{95}	Marshafolger	September 7, 1999	Socorro	LINEAR	·	3.0 km	MPC · JPL
16070 Charops	1999 RB_{101}	Charops	September 8, 1999	Socorro	LINEAR	L5	63 km	MPC · JPL
16071	1999 RW_{125}	—	September 9, 1999	Socorro	LINEAR	MRX	5.3 km	MPC · JPL
16072	1999 RE_{128}	—	September 9, 1999	Socorro	LINEAR	(5)	2.1 km	MPC · JPL
16073 Gaskin	1999 RK_{129}	Gaskin	September 9, 1999	Socorro	LINEAR	·	2.4 km	MPC · JPL
16074 Georgekaplan	1999 RR_{129}	Georgekaplan	September 9, 1999	Socorro	LINEAR	·	3.7 km	MPC · JPL
16075 Meglass	1999 RL_{130}	Meglass	September 9, 1999	Socorro	LINEAR	·	4.4 km	MPC · JPL
16076 Barryhaase	1999 RV_{131}	Barryhaase	September 9, 1999	Socorro	LINEAR	·	4.7 km	MPC · JPL
16077 Arayhamilton	1999 RK_{157}	Arayhamilton	September 9, 1999	Socorro	LINEAR	·	5.6 km	MPC · JPL
16078 Carolhersh	1999 RG_{177}	Carolhersh	September 9, 1999	Socorro	LINEAR	·	3.1 km	MPC · JPL
16079 Imada	1999 RP_{181}	Imada	September 9, 1999	Socorro	LINEAR	·	4.6 km	MPC · JPL
16080 Danielfeng	1999 RX_{184}	Danielfeng	September 9, 1999	Socorro	LINEAR	·	3.7 km	MPC · JPL
16081	1999 SR_{15}	—	September 30, 1999	Catalina	CSS	·	14 km	MPC · JPL
16082	1999 TR_{5}	—	October 2, 1999	Višnjan Observatory	K. Korlević, M. Jurić	RAF	3.8 km	MPC · JPL
16083 Jórvík	1999 TH_{12}	Jórvík	October 12, 1999	Kleť	J. Tichá, M. Tichý	·	2.5 km	MPC · JPL
16084	1999 TY_{18}	—	October 12, 1999	Črni Vrh	Mikuž, H.	NYS	2.3 km	MPC · JPL
16085 Laffan	1999 TM_{27}	Laffan	October 3, 1999	Socorro	LINEAR	·	5.1 km	MPC · JPL
16086	1999 TF_{90}	—	October 2, 1999	Socorro	LINEAR	THM	11 km	MPC · JPL
16087 Rhythmgarg	1999 TR_{102}	Rhythmgarg	October 2, 1999	Socorro	LINEAR	·	4.9 km	MPC · JPL
16088 Jessgoldstein	1999 TJ_{121}	Jessgoldstein	October 4, 1999	Socorro	LINEAR	·	4.6 km	MPC · JPL
16089 Lamb	1999 TG_{147}	Lamb	October 7, 1999	Socorro	LINEAR	MIS	6.4 km	MPC · JPL
16090 Lukaszewski	1999 TN_{147}	Lukaszewski	October 7, 1999	Socorro	LINEAR	slow	5.4 km	MPC · JPL
16091 Malchiodi	1999 TO_{152}	Malchiodi	October 7, 1999	Socorro	LINEAR	ERI	6.5 km	MPC · JPL
16092 Anudeepgolla	1999 TP_{171}	Anudeepgolla	October 10, 1999	Socorro	LINEAR	·	3.0 km	MPC · JPL
16093	1999 TQ_{180}	—	October 10, 1999	Socorro	LINEAR	HYG	10 km	MPC · JPL
16094 Scottmccord	1999 TQ_{222}	Scottmccord	October 2, 1999	Socorro	LINEAR	SUL	4.6 km	MPC · JPL
16095 Lorenball	1999 TA_{249}	Lorenball	October 8, 1999	Catalina	CSS	V	2.4 km	MPC · JPL
16096	1999 US_{6}	—	October 29, 1999	Xinglong	SCAP	MIS	5.9 km	MPC · JPL
16097	1999 UE_{50}	—	October 30, 1999	Catalina	CSS	·	3.7 km	MPC · JPL
16098	1999 VR_{9}	—	November 9, 1999	Višnjan Observatory	K. Korlević	(5)	4.8 km	MPC · JPL
16099	1999 VQ_{24}	—	November 15, 1999	Ondřejov	P. Kušnirák, P. Pravec	L4	37 km	MPC · JPL
16100 Hausknecht	1999 VO_{30}	Hausknecht	November 3, 1999	Socorro	LINEAR	·	2.1 km	MPC · JPL

== 16101–16200 ==
back to top

Designation			Discovery			Properties		Ref
Permanent	Provisional	Named after	Date	Site	Discoverer(s)	Category	Diam.	Ref
16101 Notskas	1999 VA_{36}	Notskas	November 3, 1999	Socorro	LINEAR	KOR	4.4 km	MPC · JPL
16102 Barshannon	1999 VT_{68}	Barshannon	November 4, 1999	Socorro	LINEAR	NYS ·	5.0 km	MPC · JPL
16103 Lorsolomon	1999 VU_{81}	Lorsolomon	November 5, 1999	Socorro	LINEAR	NYS	5.0 km	MPC · JPL
16104 Stesullivan	1999 VT_{177}	Stesullivan	November 6, 1999	Socorro	LINEAR	·	3.5 km	MPC · JPL
16105 Marksaunders	1999 VL_{211}	Marksaunders	November 14, 1999	Anderson Mesa	LONEOS	EOS	7.8 km	MPC · JPL
16106 Carmagnola	1999 VW_{212}	Carmagnola	November 12, 1999	Anderson Mesa	LONEOS	·	6.6 km	MPC · JPL
16107 Chanmugam	1999 WQ_{2}	Chanmugam	November 27, 1999	Baton Rouge	W. R. Cooney Jr.	PAD	7.1 km	MPC · JPL
16108	1999 WV_{3}	—	November 28, 1999	Oizumi	T. Kobayashi	·	3.8 km	MPC · JPL
16109	1999 WH_{6}	—	November 28, 1999	Višnjan Observatory	K. Korlević	·	3.5 km	MPC · JPL
16110 Paganetti	1999 WU_{8}	Paganetti	November 28, 1999	Gnosca	S. Sposetti	·	3.9 km	MPC · JPL
16111 Donstrittmatter	1999 XT_{4}	Donstrittmatter	December 4, 1999	Catalina	CSS	NYS	3.5 km	MPC · JPL
16112 Vitaris	1999 XK_{13}	Vitaris	December 5, 1999	Socorro	LINEAR	V	2.0 km	MPC · JPL
16113 Ahmed	1999 XN_{23}	Ahmed	December 6, 1999	Socorro	LINEAR	KOR	3.7 km	MPC · JPL
16114 Alyono	1999 XV_{23}	Alyono	December 6, 1999	Socorro	LINEAR	NYS	3.2 km	MPC · JPL
16115	1999 XH_{25}	—	December 6, 1999	Socorro	LINEAR	THM	13 km	MPC · JPL
16116 Balakrishnan	1999 XQ_{29}	Balakrishnan	December 6, 1999	Socorro	LINEAR	·	4.1 km	MPC · JPL
16117 Herbst	1999 XS_{29}	Herbst	December 6, 1999	Socorro	LINEAR	·	10 km	MPC · JPL
16118 Therberens	1999 XQ_{56}	Therberens	December 7, 1999	Socorro	LINEAR	·	2.7 km	MPC · JPL
16119 Bronner	1999 XS_{60}	Bronner	December 7, 1999	Socorro	LINEAR	·	4.4 km	MPC · JPL
16120 Burnim	1999 XV_{60}	Burnim	December 7, 1999	Socorro	LINEAR	·	5.2 km	MPC · JPL
16121 Burrell	1999 XD_{66}	Burrell	December 7, 1999	Socorro	LINEAR	·	5.8 km	MPC · JPL
16122 Wenyicai	1999 XW_{67}	Wenyicai	December 7, 1999	Socorro	LINEAR	·	2.9 km	MPC · JPL
16123 Jessiecheng	1999 XQ_{83}	Jessiecheng	December 7, 1999	Socorro	LINEAR	NYS	5.4 km	MPC · JPL
16124 Timdong	1999 XR_{85}	Timdong	December 7, 1999	Socorro	LINEAR	NYS	4.3 km	MPC · JPL
16125 Carriehsu	1999 XK_{86}	Carriehsu	December 7, 1999	Socorro	LINEAR	·	4.9 km	MPC · JPL
16126	1999 XQ_{86}	—	December 7, 1999	Socorro	LINEAR	·	6.6 km	MPC · JPL
16127 Farzan-Kashani	1999 XK_{92}	Farzan-Kashani	December 7, 1999	Socorro	LINEAR	·	2.0 km	MPC · JPL
16128 Kirfrieda	1999 XS_{92}	Kirfrieda	December 7, 1999	Socorro	LINEAR	MAS	2.1 km	MPC · JPL
16129 Kevingao	1999 XG_{97}	Kevingao	December 7, 1999	Socorro	LINEAR	·	2.9 km	MPC · JPL
16130 Giovine	1999 XU_{97}	Giovine	December 7, 1999	Socorro	LINEAR	·	5.4 km	MPC · JPL
16131 Kaganovich	1999 XV_{97}	Kaganovich	December 7, 1999	Socorro	LINEAR	KOR	3.7 km	MPC · JPL
16132 Angelakim	1999 XH_{99}	Angelakim	December 7, 1999	Socorro	LINEAR	NYS	9.8 km	MPC · JPL
16133	1999 XC_{100}	—	December 7, 1999	Socorro	LINEAR	·	26 km	MPC · JPL
16134	1999 XE_{100}	—	December 7, 1999	Socorro	LINEAR	·	14 km	MPC · JPL
16135 Ivarsson	1999 XY_{104}	Ivarsson	December 9, 1999	Fountain Hills	C. W. Juels	·	8.2 km	MPC · JPL
16136	1999 XR_{109}	—	December 4, 1999	Catalina	CSS	·	4.4 km	MPC · JPL
16137	1999 XX_{116}	—	December 5, 1999	Catalina	CSS	·	3.1 km	MPC · JPL
16138	1999 XV_{119}	—	December 5, 1999	Catalina	CSS	GEF	5.1 km	MPC · JPL
16139	1999 XO_{120}	—	December 5, 1999	Catalina	CSS	·	7.3 km	MPC · JPL
16140	1999 XD_{125}	—	December 7, 1999	Catalina	CSS	GEF	4.9 km	MPC · JPL
16141	1999 XT_{127}	—	December 7, 1999	Črni Vrh	H. Mikuž, S. Matičič	·	4.4 km	MPC · JPL
16142 Leung	1999 XC_{135}	Leung	December 6, 1999	Socorro	LINEAR	·	3.0 km	MPC · JPL
16143	1999 XK_{142}	—	December 12, 1999	Socorro	LINEAR	·	4.3 km	MPC · JPL
16144 Korsten	1999 XK_{144}	Korsten	December 15, 1999	Fountain Hills	C. W. Juels	EOS	8.8 km	MPC · JPL
16145	1999 XP_{166}	—	December 10, 1999	Socorro	LINEAR	·	8.5 km	MPC · JPL
16146	1999 XW_{170}	—	December 10, 1999	Socorro	LINEAR	·	5.4 km	MPC · JPL
16147 Jeanli	1999 XL_{175}	Jeanli	December 10, 1999	Socorro	LINEAR	·	3.3 km	MPC · JPL
16148 Amaraifeji	1999 XG_{188}	Amaraifeji	December 12, 1999	Socorro	LINEAR	GEF	5.9 km	MPC · JPL
16149	1999 XS_{215}	—	December 14, 1999	Socorro	LINEAR	·	8.1 km	MPC · JPL
16150 Clinch	1999 XZ_{227}	Clinch	December 9, 1999	Anderson Mesa	LONEOS	·	4.8 km	MPC · JPL
16151	1999 XF_{230}	—	December 7, 1999	Catalina	CSS	ADE	10 km	MPC · JPL
16152	1999 YN_{12}	—	December 30, 1999	San Marcello	L. Tesi, M. Tombelli	L4	16 km	MPC · JPL
16153	2000 AB	—	January 1, 2000	Višnjan Observatory	K. Korlević	HYG	13 km	MPC · JPL
16154 Dabramo	2000 AW_{2}	Dabramo	January 1, 2000	San Marcello	A. Boattini, M. Tombelli	·	20 km	MPC · JPL
16155 Buddy	2000 AF_{5}	Buddy	January 3, 2000	Reedy Creek	J. Broughton	·	6.8 km	MPC · JPL
16156	2000 AP_{39}	—	January 3, 2000	Socorro	LINEAR	·	17 km	MPC · JPL
16157 Toastmasters	2000 AS_{50}	Toastmasters	January 5, 2000	Fountain Hills	C. W. Juels	·	6.8 km	MPC · JPL
16158 Monty	2000 AV_{50}	Monty	January 5, 2000	Fountain Hills	C. W. Juels	·	5.6 km	MPC · JPL
16159	2000 AK_{62}	—	January 4, 2000	Socorro	LINEAR	·	15 km	MPC · JPL
16160	2000 AZ_{66}	—	January 4, 2000	Socorro	LINEAR	EOS	9.4 km	MPC · JPL
16161	2000 AC_{68}	—	January 4, 2000	Socorro	LINEAR	·	6.9 km	MPC · JPL
16162	2000 AD_{68}	—	January 4, 2000	Socorro	LINEAR	EOS	11 km	MPC · JPL
16163 Suhanli	2000 AD_{69}	Suhanli	January 5, 2000	Socorro	LINEAR	NYS	2.4 km	MPC · JPL
16164 Yangli	2000 AO_{69}	Yangli	January 5, 2000	Socorro	LINEAR	KOR	4.4 km	MPC · JPL
16165 Licht	2000 AW_{83}	Licht	January 5, 2000	Socorro	LINEAR	·	2.5 km	MPC · JPL
16166 Jonlii	2000 AQ_{84}	Jonlii	January 5, 2000	Socorro	LINEAR	(5)	3.2 km	MPC · JPL
16167 Oertli	2000 AJ_{89}	Oertli	January 5, 2000	Socorro	LINEAR	·	2.2 km	MPC · JPL
16168 Palmen	2000 AR_{91}	Palmen	January 5, 2000	Socorro	LINEAR	MAS	1.7 km	MPC · JPL
16169 Janapaty	2000 AO_{95}	Janapaty	January 4, 2000	Socorro	LINEAR	·	2.8 km	MPC · JPL
16170	2000 AS_{95}	—	January 4, 2000	Socorro	LINEAR	EOS	8.6 km	MPC · JPL
16171	2000 AD_{97}	—	January 4, 2000	Socorro	LINEAR	·	4.3 km	MPC · JPL
16172 Jayaweera	2000 AZ_{97}	Jayaweera	January 4, 2000	Socorro	LINEAR	·	4.0 km	MPC · JPL
16173	2000 AC_{98}	—	January 4, 2000	Socorro	LINEAR	·	3.9 km	MPC · JPL
16174 Parihar	2000 AX_{116}	Parihar	January 5, 2000	Socorro	LINEAR	·	2.5 km	MPC · JPL
16175 Rypatterson	2000 AL_{118}	Rypatterson	January 5, 2000	Socorro	LINEAR	·	4.1 km	MPC · JPL
16176	2000 AZ_{126}	—	January 5, 2000	Socorro	LINEAR	GEF	6.7 km	MPC · JPL
16177 Pelzer	2000 AR_{127}	Pelzer	January 5, 2000	Socorro	LINEAR	·	3.9 km	MPC · JPL
16178	2000 AT_{127}	—	January 5, 2000	Socorro	LINEAR	THM	9.3 km	MPC · JPL
16179 Jeloka	2000 AL_{134}	Jeloka	January 4, 2000	Socorro	LINEAR	THM	11 km	MPC · JPL
16180 Rapoport	2000 AZ_{136}	Rapoport	January 4, 2000	Socorro	LINEAR	·	3.3 km	MPC · JPL
16181	2000 AC_{137}	—	January 4, 2000	Socorro	LINEAR	HYG	11 km	MPC · JPL
16182	2000 AH_{137}	—	January 4, 2000	Socorro	LINEAR	·	3.8 km	MPC · JPL
16183	2000 AX_{138}	—	January 5, 2000	Socorro	LINEAR	·	12 km	MPC · JPL
16184	2000 AD_{142}	—	January 5, 2000	Socorro	LINEAR	GEF	7.1 km	MPC · JPL
16185 Allisonjia	2000 AH_{164}	Allisonjia	January 5, 2000	Socorro	LINEAR	TEL	5.6 km	MPC · JPL
16186 Helenajiang	2000 AK_{164}	Helenajiang	January 5, 2000	Socorro	LINEAR	EUN	5.6 km	MPC · JPL
16187	2000 AP_{164}	—	January 5, 2000	Socorro	LINEAR	EUN	6.1 km	MPC · JPL
16188	2000 AH_{175}	—	January 7, 2000	Socorro	LINEAR	GEF	6.0 km	MPC · JPL
16189 Riehl	2000 AT_{187}	Riehl	January 8, 2000	Socorro	LINEAR	·	5.1 km	MPC · JPL
16190 Kabirjolly	2000 AK_{191}	Kabirjolly	January 8, 2000	Socorro	LINEAR	MAR	4.3 km	MPC · JPL
16191 Rubyroe	2000 AO_{205}	Rubyroe	January 10, 2000	Oaxaca	Roe, J. M.	·	3.4 km	MPC · JPL
16192 Laird	2000 AU_{207}	Laird	January 4, 2000	Kitt Peak	Spacewatch	·	2.3 km	MPC · JPL
16193 Nickaiser	2000 AV_{207}	Nickaiser	January 4, 2000	Kitt Peak	Spacewatch	·	3.6 km	MPC · JPL
16194 Roderick	2000 AJ_{231}	Roderick	January 4, 2000	Anderson Mesa	LONEOS	·	19 km	MPC · JPL
16195	2000 AQ_{236}	—	January 5, 2000	Socorro	LINEAR	URS	12 km	MPC · JPL
16196	2000 AR_{236}	—	January 5, 2000	Socorro	LINEAR	·	9.4 km	MPC · JPL
16197 Bluepeter	2000 AA_{243}	Bluepeter	January 7, 2000	Anderson Mesa	LONEOS	·	4.2 km	MPC · JPL
16198 Búzios	2000 AB_{243}	Búzios	January 7, 2000	Anderson Mesa	LONEOS	slow	5.4 km	MPC · JPL
16199 Rozenblyum	2000 BX_{26}	Rozenblyum	January 30, 2000	Socorro	LINEAR	KOR	3.7 km	MPC · JPL
16200	2000 BT_{28}	—	January 30, 2000	Socorro	LINEAR	HYG	13 km	MPC · JPL

== 16201–16300 ==
back to top

Designation			Discovery			Properties		Ref
Permanent	Provisional	Named after	Date	Site	Discoverer(s)	Category	Diam.	Ref
16201	2000 CK_{1}	—	February 4, 2000	Višnjan Observatory	K. Korlević	·	3.2 km	MPC · JPL
16202 Srivastava	2000 CE_{28}	Srivastava	February 2, 2000	Socorro	LINEAR	NYS	7.1 km	MPC · JPL
16203 Jessicastahl	2000 CH_{32}	Jessicastahl	February 2, 2000	Socorro	LINEAR	·	3.5 km	MPC · JPL
16204	2000 CT_{33}	—	February 4, 2000	Višnjan Observatory	K. Korlević	·	4.6 km	MPC · JPL
16205	2000 CC_{34}	—	February 4, 2000	Višnjan Observatory	K. Korlević	·	2.7 km	MPC · JPL
16206	2000 CL_{39}	—	February 4, 2000	Socorro	LINEAR	·	6.4 km	MPC · JPL
16207 Montgomery	2000 CV_{40}	Montgomery	February 1, 2000	Catalina	CSS	EOS	6.9 km	MPC · JPL
16208	2000 CL_{52}	—	February 2, 2000	Socorro	LINEAR	·	12 km	MPC · JPL
16209 Sterner	2000 CB_{56}	Sterner	February 4, 2000	Socorro	LINEAR	MAS	2.2 km	MPC · JPL
16210	2000 CY_{61}	—	February 2, 2000	Socorro	LINEAR	·	7.1 km	MPC · JPL
16211 Samirsur	2000 CL_{83}	Samirsur	February 4, 2000	Socorro	LINEAR	·	2.7 km	MPC · JPL
16212 Theberge	2000 CB_{84}	Theberge	February 4, 2000	Socorro	LINEAR	·	3.1 km	MPC · JPL
16213	2000 CG_{85}	—	February 4, 2000	Socorro	LINEAR	URS · slow	20 km	MPC · JPL
16214 Venkatachalam	2000 CM_{87}	Venkatachalam	February 4, 2000	Socorro	LINEAR	·	5.3 km	MPC · JPL
16215 Venkatraman	2000 CB_{104}	Venkatraman	February 11, 2000	Socorro	LINEAR	·	1.8 km	MPC · JPL
16216	2000 DR_{4}	—	February 28, 2000	Socorro	LINEAR	·	15 km	MPC · JPL
16217 Peterbroughton	2000 DR_{13}	Peterbroughton	February 28, 2000	Kitt Peak	Spacewatch	·	3.0 km	MPC · JPL
16218 Mintakeyes	2000 DV_{14}	Mintakeyes	February 26, 2000	Catalina	CSS	·	10 km	MPC · JPL
16219 Venturelli	2000 DL_{29}	Venturelli	February 29, 2000	Socorro	LINEAR	·	2.0 km	MPC · JPL
16220 Mikewagner	2000 DB_{40}	Mikewagner	February 29, 2000	Socorro	LINEAR	fast	4.0 km	MPC · JPL
16221 Kevinyang	2000 DX_{48}	Kevinyang	February 29, 2000	Socorro	LINEAR	·	3.2 km	MPC · JPL
16222 Donnanderson	2000 DK_{55}	Donnanderson	February 29, 2000	Socorro	LINEAR	·	1.9 km	MPC · JPL
16223 Racheljoseph	2000 DR_{69}	Racheljoseph	February 29, 2000	Socorro	LINEAR	KOR	5.0 km	MPC · JPL
16224	2000 DU_{69}	—	February 29, 2000	Socorro	LINEAR	·	5.2 km	MPC · JPL
16225 Georgebaldo	2000 DF_{71}	Georgebaldo	February 29, 2000	Socorro	LINEAR	·	3.3 km	MPC · JPL
16226 Beaton	2000 DT_{72}	Beaton	February 29, 2000	Socorro	LINEAR	·	8.2 km	MPC · JPL
16227 Emilykang	2000 DY_{73}	Emilykang	February 29, 2000	Socorro	LINEAR	KOR	5.7 km	MPC · JPL
16228 Adhamkassem	2000 EC_{39}	Adhamkassem	March 8, 2000	Socorro	LINEAR	THM	10 km	MPC · JPL
16229 Kavyakoneru	2000 EM_{46}	Kavyakoneru	March 9, 2000	Socorro	LINEAR	THM	9.8 km	MPC · JPL
16230 Benson	2000 EA_{95}	Benson	March 9, 2000	Socorro	LINEAR	·	4.4 km	MPC · JPL
16231 Jessberger	2000 ES_{130}	Jessberger	March 11, 2000	Anderson Mesa	LONEOS	slow	9.0 km	MPC · JPL
16232 Chijagerbs	2000 ED_{152}	Chijagerbs	March 6, 2000	Haleakala	NEAT	HIL · 3:2	15 km	MPC · JPL
16233	2000 FA_{12}	—	March 31, 2000	Socorro	LINEAR	MAR	7.2 km	MPC · JPL
16234 Bosse	2000 FR_{20}	Bosse	March 29, 2000	Socorro	LINEAR	V	3.0 km	MPC · JPL
16235	2000 FF_{46}	—	March 29, 2000	Socorro	LINEAR	DOR	12 km	MPC · JPL
16236 Stebrehmer	2000 GG_{51}	Stebrehmer	April 5, 2000	Socorro	LINEAR	·	4.3 km	MPC · JPL
16237 Emmakratcha	2000 GX_{76}	Emmakratcha	April 5, 2000	Socorro	LINEAR	slow	6.0 km	MPC · JPL
16238 Chappe	2000 GY_{104}	Chappe	April 7, 2000	Socorro	LINEAR	·	4.1 km	MPC · JPL
16239 Dower	2000 GY_{105}	Dower	April 7, 2000	Socorro	LINEAR	·	2.7 km	MPC · JPL
16240	2000 GJ_{115}	—	April 8, 2000	Socorro	LINEAR	slow	12 km	MPC · JPL
16241 Dvorsky	2000 GD_{126}	Dvorsky	April 7, 2000	Socorro	LINEAR	·	5.0 km	MPC · JPL
16242 Licato	2000 GT_{126}	Licato	April 7, 2000	Socorro	LINEAR	·	9.2 km	MPC · JPL
16243 Rosenbauer	2000 GO_{147}	Rosenbauer	April 4, 2000	Anderson Mesa	LONEOS	·	14 km	MPC · JPL
16244 Brož	2000 GQ_{147}	Brož	April 4, 2000	Anderson Mesa	LONEOS	·	3.0 km	MPC · JPL
16245 Katielu	2000 GM_{160}	Katielu	April 7, 2000	Socorro	LINEAR	·	7.3 km	MPC · JPL
16246 Cantor	2000 HO_{3}	Cantor	April 27, 2000	Prescott	P. G. Comba	THM	7.2 km	MPC · JPL
16247 Esner	2000 HY_{11}	Esner	April 28, 2000	Socorro	LINEAR	KOR	3.2 km	MPC · JPL
16248 Fox	2000 HT_{13}	Fox	April 28, 2000	Socorro	LINEAR	·	4.3 km	MPC · JPL
16249 Cauchy	2000 HT_{14}	Cauchy	April 29, 2000	Prescott	P. G. Comba	KOR · fast	3.5 km	MPC · JPL
16250 Delbó	2000 HP_{26}	Delbó	April 26, 2000	Anderson Mesa	LONEOS	·	3.1 km	MPC · JPL
16251 Barbifrank	2000 HX_{48}	Barbifrank	April 29, 2000	Socorro	LINEAR	NYS	3.1 km	MPC · JPL
16252 Franfrost	2000 HQ_{51}	Franfrost	April 29, 2000	Socorro	LINEAR	NYS	4.4 km	MPC · JPL
16253 Griffis	2000 HJ_{52}	Griffis	April 29, 2000	Socorro	LINEAR	·	5.0 km	MPC · JPL
16254 Harper	2000 HZ_{53}	Harper	April 29, 2000	Socorro	LINEAR	KOR	4.0 km	MPC · JPL
16255 Hampton	2000 HX_{63}	Hampton	April 26, 2000	Anderson Mesa	LONEOS	KOR	4.6 km	MPC · JPL
16256	2000 JM_{2}	—	May 3, 2000	Socorro	LINEAR	H	2.0 km	MPC · JPL
16257	2000 JY_{6}	—	May 4, 2000	Socorro	LINEAR	·	18 km	MPC · JPL
16258 Willhayes	2000 JP_{13}	Willhayes	May 6, 2000	Socorro	LINEAR	·	4.1 km	MPC · JPL
16259 Housinger	2000 JR_{13}	Housinger	May 6, 2000	Socorro	LINEAR	·	8.9 km	MPC · JPL
16260 Sputnik	2000 JO_{15}	Sputnik	May 9, 2000	Reedy Creek	J. Broughton	·	5.0 km	MPC · JPL
16261 Iidemachi	2000 JF_{18}	Iidemachi	May 4, 2000	Nanyo	T. Okuni	·	8.3 km	MPC · JPL
16262 Rikurtz	2000 JR_{32}	Rikurtz	May 7, 2000	Socorro	LINEAR	·	4.3 km	MPC · JPL
16263	2000 JV_{37}	—	May 7, 2000	Socorro	LINEAR	THM	7.2 km	MPC · JPL
16264 Richlee	2000 JH_{40}	Richlee	May 7, 2000	Socorro	LINEAR	(7744)	4.5 km	MPC · JPL
16265 Lemay	2000 JL_{43}	Lemay	May 7, 2000	Socorro	LINEAR	THM	8.8 km	MPC · JPL
16266 Johconnell	2000 JX_{43}	Johconnell	May 7, 2000	Socorro	LINEAR	BRA	5.7 km	MPC · JPL
16267 Mcdermott	2000 JY_{43}	Mcdermott	May 7, 2000	Socorro	LINEAR	·	3.9 km	MPC · JPL
16268 Mcneeley	2000 JD_{44}	Mcneeley	May 7, 2000	Socorro	LINEAR	NYS	2.9 km	MPC · JPL
16269 Merkord	2000 JP_{44}	Merkord	May 7, 2000	Socorro	LINEAR	·	7.1 km	MPC · JPL
16270	2000 JH_{48}	—	May 9, 2000	Socorro	LINEAR	·	7.3 km	MPC · JPL
16271 Duanenichols	2000 JC_{55}	Duanenichols	May 6, 2000	Socorro	LINEAR	·	4.2 km	MPC · JPL
16272	2000 JS_{55}	—	May 6, 2000	Socorro	LINEAR	·	16 km	MPC · JPL
16273 Oneill	2000 JS_{56}	Oneill	May 6, 2000	Socorro	LINEAR	·	4.8 km	MPC · JPL
16274 Pavlica	2000 JX_{56}	Pavlica	May 6, 2000	Socorro	LINEAR	V	2.5 km	MPC · JPL
16275 Charlesma	2000 JP_{58}	Charlesma	May 6, 2000	Socorro	LINEAR	·	6.9 km	MPC · JPL
16276 Virginiama	2000 JX_{61}	Virginiama	May 7, 2000	Socorro	LINEAR	slow	6.9 km	MPC · JPL
16277 Mallada	2000 JW_{74}	Mallada	May 4, 2000	Kitt Peak	Spacewatch	·	13 km	MPC · JPL
16278	2000 JM_{77}	—	May 7, 2000	Socorro	LINEAR	THM	11 km	MPC · JPL
16279	2000 KJ_{23}	—	May 28, 2000	Socorro	LINEAR	THM	12 km	MPC · JPL
16280 Groussin	2000 LS_{6}	Groussin	June 1, 2000	Anderson Mesa	LONEOS	·	3.1 km	MPC · JPL
16281	2071 P-L	—	September 24, 1960	Palomar	C. J. van Houten, I. van Houten-Groeneveld, T. Gehrels	(7744)	3.4 km	MPC · JPL
16282	2512 P-L	—	September 24, 1960	Palomar	C. J. van Houten, I. van Houten-Groeneveld, T. Gehrels	·	4.6 km	MPC · JPL
16283	2545 P-L	—	September 24, 1960	Palomar	C. J. van Houten, I. van Houten-Groeneveld, T. Gehrels	GEF	3.8 km	MPC · JPL
16284	2861 P-L	—	September 24, 1960	Palomar	C. J. van Houten, I. van Houten-Groeneveld, T. Gehrels	·	6.3 km	MPC · JPL
16285	3047 P-L	—	September 24, 1960	Palomar	C. J. van Houten, I. van Houten-Groeneveld, T. Gehrels	INA	12 km	MPC · JPL
16286	4057 P-L	—	September 24, 1960	Palomar	C. J. van Houten, I. van Houten-Groeneveld, T. Gehrels	(16286)	4.4 km	MPC · JPL
16287	4096 P-L	—	September 24, 1960	Palomar	C. J. van Houten, I. van Houten-Groeneveld, T. Gehrels	·	7.6 km	MPC · JPL
16288	4169 P-L	—	September 24, 1960	Palomar	C. J. van Houten, I. van Houten-Groeneveld, T. Gehrels	·	6.0 km	MPC · JPL
16289	4201 P-L	—	September 24, 1960	Palomar	C. J. van Houten, I. van Houten-Groeneveld, T. Gehrels	·	5.3 km	MPC · JPL
16290	4204 P-L	—	September 24, 1960	Palomar	C. J. van Houten, I. van Houten-Groeneveld, T. Gehrels	·	4.7 km	MPC · JPL
16291	4315 P-L	—	September 24, 1960	Palomar	C. J. van Houten, I. van Houten-Groeneveld, T. Gehrels	KOR	3.7 km	MPC · JPL
16292	4557 P-L	—	September 24, 1960	Palomar	C. J. van Houten, I. van Houten-Groeneveld, T. Gehrels	·	1.7 km	MPC · JPL
16293	4613 P-L	—	September 24, 1960	Palomar	C. J. van Houten, I. van Houten-Groeneveld, T. Gehrels	·	2.5 km	MPC · JPL
16294	4758 P-L	—	September 24, 1960	Palomar	C. J. van Houten, I. van Houten-Groeneveld, T. Gehrels	·	4.9 km	MPC · JPL
16295	4820 P-L	—	September 24, 1960	Palomar	C. J. van Houten, I. van Houten-Groeneveld, T. Gehrels	EOS	5.1 km	MPC · JPL
16296	6308 P-L	—	September 24, 1960	Palomar	C. J. van Houten, I. van Houten-Groeneveld, T. Gehrels	·	3.5 km	MPC · JPL
16297	6346 P-L	—	September 24, 1960	Palomar	C. J. van Houten, I. van Houten-Groeneveld, T. Gehrels	·	8.6 km	MPC · JPL
16298	6529 P-L	—	September 24, 1960	Palomar	C. J. van Houten, I. van Houten-Groeneveld, T. Gehrels	THM	6.6 km	MPC · JPL
16299	6566 P-L	—	September 24, 1960	Palomar	C. J. van Houten, I. van Houten-Groeneveld, T. Gehrels	·	3.7 km	MPC · JPL
16300	6569 P-L	—	September 24, 1960	Palomar	C. J. van Houten, I. van Houten-Groeneveld, T. Gehrels	THM	10 km	MPC · JPL

== 16301–16400 ==
back to top

Designation			Discovery			Properties		Ref
Permanent	Provisional	Named after	Date	Site	Discoverer(s)	Category	Diam.	Ref
16301	6576 P-L	—	September 24, 1960	Palomar	C. J. van Houten, I. van Houten-Groeneveld, T. Gehrels	·	4.0 km	MPC · JPL
16302	6634 P-L	—	September 24, 1960	Palomar	C. J. van Houten, I. van Houten-Groeneveld, T. Gehrels	·	7.8 km	MPC · JPL
16303	6639 P-L	—	September 24, 1960	Palomar	C. J. van Houten, I. van Houten-Groeneveld, T. Gehrels	THM	6.3 km	MPC · JPL
16304	6704 P-L	—	September 24, 1960	Palomar	C. J. van Houten, I. van Houten-Groeneveld, T. Gehrels	·	3.1 km	MPC · JPL
16305	6707 P-L	—	September 24, 1960	Palomar	C. J. van Houten, I. van Houten-Groeneveld, T. Gehrels	·	4.7 km	MPC · JPL
16306	6797 P-L	—	September 24, 1960	Palomar	C. J. van Houten, I. van Houten-Groeneveld, T. Gehrels	MAS	2.6 km	MPC · JPL
16307	7569 P-L	—	October 17, 1960	Palomar	C. J. van Houten, I. van Houten-Groeneveld, T. Gehrels	·	2.2 km	MPC · JPL
16308	7627 P-L	—	October 22, 1960	Palomar	C. J. van Houten, I. van Houten-Groeneveld, T. Gehrels	·	2.9 km	MPC · JPL
16309	9054 P-L	—	October 17, 1960	Palomar	C. J. van Houten, I. van Houten-Groeneveld, T. Gehrels	·	4.8 km	MPC · JPL
16310	1043 T-1	—	March 25, 1971	Palomar	C. J. van Houten, I. van Houten-Groeneveld, T. Gehrels	·	2.4 km	MPC · JPL
16311	1102 T-1	—	March 25, 1971	Palomar	C. J. van Houten, I. van Houten-Groeneveld, T. Gehrels	V	2.3 km	MPC · JPL
16312	1122 T-1	—	March 25, 1971	Palomar	C. J. van Houten, I. van Houten-Groeneveld, T. Gehrels	PAD	9.0 km	MPC · JPL
16313	1199 T-1	—	March 25, 1971	Palomar	C. J. van Houten, I. van Houten-Groeneveld, T. Gehrels	KOR	4.3 km	MPC · JPL
16314	1248 T-1	—	March 25, 1971	Palomar	C. J. van Houten, I. van Houten-Groeneveld, T. Gehrels	HYG	11 km	MPC · JPL
16315	2055 T-1	—	March 25, 1971	Palomar	C. J. van Houten, I. van Houten-Groeneveld, T. Gehrels	(194)	5.8 km	MPC · JPL
16316	2089 T-1	—	March 25, 1971	Palomar	C. J. van Houten, I. van Houten-Groeneveld, T. Gehrels	THM	9.4 km	MPC · JPL
16317	2127 T-1	—	March 25, 1971	Palomar	C. J. van Houten, I. van Houten-Groeneveld, T. Gehrels	·	5.3 km	MPC · JPL
16318	2128 T-1	—	March 25, 1971	Palomar	C. J. van Houten, I. van Houten-Groeneveld, T. Gehrels	·	4.8 km	MPC · JPL
16319 Xiamenerzhong	3252 T-1	Xiamenerzhong	March 26, 1971	Palomar	C. J. van Houten, I. van Houten-Groeneveld, T. Gehrels	·	2.4 km	MPC · JPL
16320	4078 T-1	—	March 26, 1971	Palomar	C. J. van Houten, I. van Houten-Groeneveld, T. Gehrels	·	2.2 km	MPC · JPL
16321	4225 T-1	—	March 26, 1971	Palomar	C. J. van Houten, I. van Houten-Groeneveld, T. Gehrels	·	4.0 km	MPC · JPL
16322	4409 T-1	—	March 26, 1971	Palomar	C. J. van Houten, I. van Houten-Groeneveld, T. Gehrels	·	2.5 km	MPC · JPL
16323	1107 T-2	—	September 29, 1973	Palomar	C. J. van Houten, I. van Houten-Groeneveld, T. Gehrels	·	6.2 km	MPC · JPL
16324	1181 T-2	—	September 29, 1973	Palomar	C. J. van Houten, I. van Houten-Groeneveld, T. Gehrels	KOR	4.5 km	MPC · JPL
16325	1332 T-2	—	September 29, 1973	Palomar	C. J. van Houten, I. van Houten-Groeneveld, T. Gehrels	·	5.2 km	MPC · JPL
16326	2052 T-2	—	September 29, 1973	Palomar	C. J. van Houten, I. van Houten-Groeneveld, T. Gehrels	KOR	5.6 km	MPC · JPL
16327	3092 T-2	—	September 30, 1973	Palomar	C. J. van Houten, I. van Houten-Groeneveld, T. Gehrels	·	3.8 km	MPC · JPL
16328	3111 T-2	—	September 30, 1973	Palomar	C. J. van Houten, I. van Houten-Groeneveld, T. Gehrels	EUN	3.8 km	MPC · JPL
16329	3255 T-2	—	September 30, 1973	Palomar	C. J. van Houten, I. van Houten-Groeneveld, T. Gehrels	·	4.0 km	MPC · JPL
16330	3276 T-2	—	September 30, 1973	Palomar	C. J. van Houten, I. van Houten-Groeneveld, T. Gehrels	·	3.2 km	MPC · JPL
16331	4101 T-2	—	September 29, 1973	Palomar	C. J. van Houten, I. van Houten-Groeneveld, T. Gehrels	THM	12 km	MPC · JPL
16332	4117 T-2	—	September 29, 1973	Palomar	C. J. van Houten, I. van Houten-Groeneveld, T. Gehrels	THM	14 km	MPC · JPL
16333	4122 T-2	—	September 29, 1973	Palomar	C. J. van Houten, I. van Houten-Groeneveld, T. Gehrels	·	7.0 km	MPC · JPL
16334	4278 T-2	—	September 29, 1973	Palomar	C. J. van Houten, I. van Houten-Groeneveld, T. Gehrels	·	3.1 km	MPC · JPL
16335	5058 T-2	—	September 25, 1973	Palomar	C. J. van Houten, I. van Houten-Groeneveld, T. Gehrels	·	9.4 km	MPC · JPL
16336	5080 T-2	—	September 25, 1973	Palomar	C. J. van Houten, I. van Houten-Groeneveld, T. Gehrels	·	2.2 km	MPC · JPL
16337	5087 T-2	—	September 25, 1973	Palomar	C. J. van Houten, I. van Houten-Groeneveld, T. Gehrels	EOS	7.9 km	MPC · JPL
16338	1106 T-3	—	October 17, 1977	Palomar	C. J. van Houten, I. van Houten-Groeneveld, T. Gehrels	·	5.5 km	MPC · JPL
16339	2053 T-3	—	October 16, 1977	Palomar	C. J. van Houten, I. van Houten-Groeneveld, T. Gehrels	HYG	7.0 km	MPC · JPL
16340	2110 T-3	—	October 16, 1977	Palomar	C. J. van Houten, I. van Houten-Groeneveld, T. Gehrels	·	4.1 km	MPC · JPL
16341	2182 T-3	—	October 16, 1977	Palomar	C. J. van Houten, I. van Houten-Groeneveld, T. Gehrels	·	2.8 km	MPC · JPL
16342	2271 T-3	—	October 16, 1977	Palomar	C. J. van Houten, I. van Houten-Groeneveld, T. Gehrels	KOR	5.0 km	MPC · JPL
16343	2326 T-3	—	October 16, 1977	Palomar	C. J. van Houten, I. van Houten-Groeneveld, T. Gehrels	·	3.2 km	MPC · JPL
16344	2370 T-3	—	October 16, 1977	Palomar	C. J. van Houten, I. van Houten-Groeneveld, T. Gehrels	GEF	4.1 km	MPC · JPL
16345	2391 T-3	—	October 16, 1977	Palomar	C. J. van Houten, I. van Houten-Groeneveld, T. Gehrels	KOR	3.5 km	MPC · JPL
16346	2682 T-3	—	October 11, 1977	Palomar	C. J. van Houten, I. van Houten-Groeneveld, T. Gehrels	·	15 km	MPC · JPL
16347	3256 T-3	—	October 16, 1977	Palomar	C. J. van Houten, I. van Houten-Groeneveld, T. Gehrels	KOR	5.9 km	MPC · JPL
16348	3465 T-3	—	October 16, 1977	Palomar	C. J. van Houten, I. van Houten-Groeneveld, T. Gehrels	EOS	6.1 km	MPC · JPL
16349	4062 T-3	—	October 16, 1977	Palomar	C. J. van Houten, I. van Houten-Groeneveld, T. Gehrels	·	3.8 km	MPC · JPL
16350	1964 VZ_{2}	—	November 11, 1964	Nanking	Purple Mountain	·	8.7 km	MPC · JPL
16351	1971 US	—	October 26, 1971	Hamburg-Bergedorf	L. Kohoutek	·	5.7 km	MPC · JPL
16352	1974 FF	—	March 22, 1974	Cerro El Roble	C. Torres	·	3.6 km	MPC · JPL
16353	1974 WB	—	November 16, 1974	Harvard Observatory	Harvard Observatory	slow	6.9 km	MPC · JPL
16354	1975 SN_{1}	—	September 30, 1975	Palomar	S. J. Bus	fast	5.1 km	MPC · JPL
16355 Buber	1975 UA_{1}	Buber	October 29, 1975	Tautenburg Observatory	F. Börngen	EUN	2.8 km	MPC · JPL
16356 Univbalttech	1976 GV_{2}	Univbalttech	April 1, 1976	Nauchnij	N. S. Chernykh	THM	15 km	MPC · JPL
16357 Risanpei	1976 UP_{18}	Risanpei	October 22, 1976	Kiso	H. Kosai, K. Furukawa	·	2.4 km	MPC · JPL
16358 Plesetsk	1976 YN_{7}	Plesetsk	December 20, 1976	Nauchnij	N. S. Chernykh	EUN	7.2 km	MPC · JPL
16359	1978 VO_{4}	—	November 7, 1978	Palomar	E. F. Helin, S. J. Bus	NYS ·	7.5 km	MPC · JPL
16360	1978 VY_{5}	—	November 7, 1978	Palomar	E. F. Helin, S. J. Bus	·	2.7 km	MPC · JPL
16361	1979 MS_{1}	—	June 25, 1979	Siding Spring	E. F. Helin, S. J. Bus	·	5.1 km	MPC · JPL
16362	1979 MJ_{4}	—	June 25, 1979	Siding Spring	E. F. Helin, S. J. Bus	ADE	7.4 km	MPC · JPL
16363	1979 MT_{4}	—	June 25, 1979	Siding Spring	E. F. Helin, S. J. Bus	EUN	5.4 km	MPC · JPL
16364	1979 MA_{5}	—	June 25, 1979	Siding Spring	E. F. Helin, S. J. Bus	EOS	6.9 km	MPC · JPL
16365	1979 MK_{5}	—	June 25, 1979	Siding Spring	E. F. Helin, S. J. Bus	(5)	4.4 km	MPC · JPL
16366	1979 ME_{7}	—	June 25, 1979	Siding Spring	E. F. Helin, S. J. Bus	EUN	5.6 km	MPC · JPL
16367 Astronomiasvecia	1980 FS_{4}	Astronomiasvecia	March 16, 1980	La Silla	C.-I. Lagerkvist	·	5.9 km	MPC · JPL
16368 Città di Alba	1981 DF	Città di Alba	February 28, 1981	La Silla	H. Debehogne, G. de Sanctis	(5651)	17 km	MPC · JPL
16369	1981 DJ	—	February 28, 1981	Siding Spring	S. J. Bus	·	11 km	MPC · JPL
16370	1981 DA_{2}	—	February 28, 1981	Siding Spring	S. J. Bus	·	5.7 km	MPC · JPL
16371	1981 DQ_{3}	—	February 28, 1981	Siding Spring	S. J. Bus	ADE	8.6 km	MPC · JPL
16372 Demichele	1981 EP_{1}	Demichele	March 7, 1981	La Silla	H. Debehogne, G. de Sanctis	·	7.8 km	MPC · JPL
16373	1981 ES_{5}	—	March 7, 1981	Siding Spring	S. J. Bus	·	7.1 km	MPC · JPL
16374	1981 EA_{10}	—	March 1, 1981	Siding Spring	S. J. Bus	·	9.4 km	MPC · JPL
16375	1981 EM_{10}	—	March 1, 1981	Siding Spring	S. J. Bus	VER	12 km	MPC · JPL
16376	1981 EX_{10}	—	March 1, 1981	Siding Spring	S. J. Bus	·	4.7 km	MPC · JPL
16377	1981 EY_{11}	—	March 7, 1981	Siding Spring	S. J. Bus	·	2.7 km	MPC · JPL
16378	1981 ET_{17}	—	March 2, 1981	Siding Spring	S. J. Bus	·	4.4 km	MPC · JPL
16379	1981 EJ_{18}	—	March 2, 1981	Siding Spring	S. J. Bus	HYG	9.3 km	MPC · JPL
16380	1981 EJ_{20}	—	March 2, 1981	Siding Spring	S. J. Bus	·	7.1 km	MPC · JPL
16381	1981 EG_{25}	—	March 2, 1981	Siding Spring	S. J. Bus	·	5.2 km	MPC · JPL
16382	1981 ER_{27}	—	March 2, 1981	Siding Spring	S. J. Bus	V	2.3 km	MPC · JPL
16383	1981 EV_{30}	—	March 2, 1981	Siding Spring	S. J. Bus	·	5.4 km	MPC · JPL
16384	1981 ES_{31}	—	March 2, 1981	Siding Spring	S. J. Bus	·	9.0 km	MPC · JPL
16385	1981 EQ_{32}	—	March 7, 1981	Siding Spring	S. J. Bus	·	5.1 km	MPC · JPL
16386	1981 ET_{34}	—	March 2, 1981	Siding Spring	S. J. Bus	·	7.3 km	MPC · JPL
16387	1981 EB_{37}	—	March 11, 1981	Siding Spring	S. J. Bus	·	6.0 km	MPC · JPL
16388	1981 EA_{39}	—	March 2, 1981	Siding Spring	S. J. Bus	NYS	2.6 km	MPC · JPL
16389	1981 EC_{39}	—	March 2, 1981	Siding Spring	S. J. Bus	·	3.8 km	MPC · JPL
16390	1981 EG_{39}	—	March 2, 1981	Siding Spring	S. J. Bus	HYG	7.4 km	MPC · JPL
16391	1981 EM_{40}	—	March 2, 1981	Siding Spring	S. J. Bus	(11882)	4.4 km	MPC · JPL
16392	1981 EP_{42}	—	March 2, 1981	Siding Spring	S. J. Bus	·	3.0 km	MPC · JPL
16393	1981 QS	—	August 24, 1981	Kleť	L. Brožek	·	3.6 km	MPC · JPL
16394	1981 QD_{4}	—	August 30, 1981	Palomar	S. J. Bus	MAR	7.0 km	MPC · JPL
16395 Ioannpravednyj	1981 US_{14}	Ioannpravednyj	October 23, 1981	Nauchnij	L. I. Chernykh	·	9.2 km	MPC · JPL
16396	1981 UN_{22}	—	October 24, 1981	Palomar	S. J. Bus	·	2.6 km	MPC · JPL
16397 Carlahayden	1982 JS_{2}	Carlahayden	May 15, 1982	Palomar	E. F. Helin, E. M. Shoemaker	·	3.0 km	MPC · JPL
16398 Hummel	1982 SN_{3}	Hummel	September 24, 1982	Tautenburg Observatory	F. Börngen	NYS	3.6 km	MPC · JPL
16399 Grokhovsky	1983 RF_{2}	Grokhovsky	September 14, 1983	Anderson Mesa	E. Bowell	·	7.7 km	MPC · JPL
16400	1984 SS_{1}	—	September 27, 1984	Kleť	Z. Vávrová	·	3.8 km	MPC · JPL

== 16401–16500 ==
back to top

Designation			Discovery			Properties		Ref
Permanent	Provisional	Named after	Date	Site	Discoverer(s)	Category	Diam.	Ref
16401	1984 SV_{5}	—	September 21, 1984	La Silla	H. Debehogne	EOS	7.7 km	MPC · JPL
16402 Olgapopova	1984 UR	Olgapopova	October 26, 1984	Anderson Mesa	E. Bowell	·	5.9 km	MPC · JPL
16403	1984 WJ_{1}	—	November 20, 1984	Caussols	C. Pollas	·	4.1 km	MPC · JPL
16404	1985 CM_{1}	—	February 13, 1985	La Silla	H. Debehogne	·	3.7 km	MPC · JPL
16405 Testudo	1985 DA_{2}	Testudo	February 20, 1985	La Silla	H. Debehogne	·	4.2 km	MPC · JPL
16406 Oszkiewicz	1985 PH	Oszkiewicz	August 14, 1985	Anderson Mesa	E. Bowell	·	4.8 km	MPC · JPL
16407 Oiunskij	1985 SV_{2}	Oiunskij	September 19, 1985	Nauchnij	N. S. Chernykh, L. I. Chernykh	·	3.9 km	MPC · JPL
16408	1986 AB	—	January 11, 1986	Toyota	K. Suzuki, T. Urata	·	14 km	MPC · JPL
16409	1986 CZ_{1}	—	February 12, 1986	La Silla	H. Debehogne	slow	3.5 km	MPC · JPL
16410	1986 QU_{2}	—	August 28, 1986	La Silla	H. Debehogne	·	9.1 km	MPC · JPL
16411	1986 QY_{2}	—	August 28, 1986	La Silla	H. Debehogne	·	6.8 km	MPC · JPL
16412	1986 WZ	—	November 25, 1986	Kleť	Z. Vávrová	·	7.0 km	MPC · JPL
16413 Abulghazi	1987 BA_{2}	Abulghazi	January 28, 1987	La Silla	E. W. Elst	·	11 km	MPC · JPL
16414 Le Procope	1987 QO_{5}	Le Procope	August 25, 1987	La Silla	E. W. Elst	·	2.7 km	MPC · JPL
16415	1987 QE_{7}	—	August 21, 1987	Zimmerwald	P. Wild	ADE	11 km	MPC · JPL
16416	1987 SM_{3}	—	September 25, 1987	Brorfelde	P. Jensen	·	3.4 km	MPC · JPL
16417	1987 SF_{5}	—	September 30, 1987	Brorfelde	P. Jensen	·	2.0 km	MPC · JPL
16418 Lortzing	1987 SD_{10}	Lortzing	September 29, 1987	Tautenburg Observatory	F. Börngen	·	4.7 km	MPC · JPL
16419 Kovalev	1987 SS_{28}	Kovalev	September 24, 1987	Nauchnij	L. V. Zhuravleva	·	3.3 km	MPC · JPL
16420	1987 UN_{1}	—	October 28, 1987	Kushiro	S. Ueda, H. Kaneda	EUN	4.2 km	MPC · JPL
16421 Roadrunner	1988 BJ	Roadrunner	January 22, 1988	Haute Provence	E. W. Elst	H · slow	3.3 km	MPC · JPL
16422	1988 BT_{3}	—	January 18, 1988	La Silla	H. Debehogne	·	3.2 km	MPC · JPL
16423	1988 BZ_{3}	—	January 19, 1988	La Silla	H. Debehogne	·	4.2 km	MPC · JPL
16424 Davaine	1988 CD_{2}	Davaine	February 11, 1988	La Silla	E. W. Elst	·	2.5 km	MPC · JPL
16425 Chuckyeager	1988 CY_{2}	Chuckyeager	February 11, 1988	La Silla	E. W. Elst	·	3.1 km	MPC · JPL
16426	1988 EC	—	March 7, 1988	Gekko	Y. Oshima	H	2.8 km	MPC · JPL
16427	1988 EB_{2}	—	March 13, 1988	Brorfelde	P. Jensen	·	4.9 km	MPC · JPL
16428	1988 RD_{12}	—	September 14, 1988	Cerro Tololo	S. J. Bus	L5	22 km	MPC · JPL
16429	1988 SB_{2}	—	September 16, 1988	Cerro Tololo	S. J. Bus	·	3.9 km	MPC · JPL
16430	1988 VB_{1}	—	November 3, 1988	Brorfelde	P. Jensen	EUN	4.9 km	MPC · JPL
16431	1988 VH_{1}	—	November 6, 1988	Yorii	M. Arai, H. Mori	·	3.5 km	MPC · JPL
16432	1988 VL_{2}	—	November 10, 1988	Yorii	M. Arai, H. Mori	·	3.6 km	MPC · JPL
16433	1988 VX_{2}	—	November 8, 1988	Kushiro	S. Ueda, H. Kaneda	·	16 km	MPC · JPL
16434	1988 VO_{3}	—	November 11, 1988	Gekko	Y. Oshima	(5)	3.2 km	MPC · JPL
16435 Fándly	1988 VE_{7}	Fándly	November 7, 1988	Piwnice	M. Antal	·	4.9 km	MPC · JPL
16436	1988 XL	—	December 3, 1988	Gekko	Y. Oshima	·	4.0 km	MPC · JPL
16437	1988 XX_{1}	—	December 7, 1988	Harvard Observatory	Oak Ridge Observatory	EUN	4.4 km	MPC · JPL
16438 Knöfel	1989 AU_{6}	Knöfel	January 11, 1989	Tautenburg Observatory	F. Börngen	PAD	11 km	MPC · JPL
16439 Yamehoshinokawa	1989 BZ	Yamehoshinokawa	January 30, 1989	Kitami	T. Fujii, K. Watanabe	EUN	7.5 km	MPC · JPL
16440	1989 EN_{5}	—	March 2, 1989	Siding Spring	R. H. McNaught	·	2.8 km	MPC · JPL
16441 Kirchner	1989 EF_{6}	Kirchner	March 7, 1989	Tautenburg Observatory	F. Börngen	·	8.3 km	MPC · JPL
16442	1989 GM_{1}	—	April 3, 1989	La Silla	E. W. Elst	EUN	4.9 km	MPC · JPL
16443	1989 GV_{1}	—	April 3, 1989	La Silla	E. W. Elst	(1338) (FLO)	3.1 km	MPC · JPL
16444 Godefroy	1989 GW_{1}	Godefroy	April 3, 1989	La Silla	E. W. Elst	·	3.3 km	MPC · JPL
16445 Klimt	1989 GN_{3}	Klimt	April 3, 1989	La Silla	E. W. Elst	·	20 km	MPC · JPL
16446	1989 MH	—	June 29, 1989	Palomar	E. F. Helin	·	11 km	MPC · JPL
16447 Vauban	1989 RX	Vauban	September 3, 1989	Haute Provence	E. W. Elst	·	13 km	MPC · JPL
16448	1989 RV_{2}	—	September 7, 1989	Kleť	A. Mrkos	·	3.5 km	MPC · JPL
16449 Kigoyama	1989 SO	Kigoyama	September 29, 1989	Kitami	T. Fujii, K. Watanabe	·	16 km	MPC · JPL
16450 Messerschmidt	1989 SY_{2}	Messerschmidt	September 26, 1989	La Silla	E. W. Elst	HYG	14 km	MPC · JPL
16451	1989 SO_{3}	—	September 26, 1989	La Silla	E. W. Elst	·	4.3 km	MPC · JPL
16452 Goldfinger	1989 SE_{8}	Goldfinger	September 28, 1989	Palomar	C. S. Shoemaker, E. M. Shoemaker	V	4.5 km	MPC · JPL
16453	1989 SW_{8}	—	September 23, 1989	La Silla	H. Debehogne	EUN	5.9 km	MPC · JPL
16454	1989 TT_{2}	—	October 3, 1989	Cerro Tololo	S. J. Bus	HYG	16 km	MPC · JPL
16455	1989 TK_{16}	—	October 4, 1989	La Silla	H. Debehogne	NYS	3.4 km	MPC · JPL
16456	1989 UO	—	October 23, 1989	Kani	Y. Mizuno, T. Furuta	NYS	4.6 km	MPC · JPL
16457	1989 VF	—	November 2, 1989	Kushiro	S. Ueda, H. Kaneda	EOS	11 km	MPC · JPL
16458	1989 WZ_{2}	—	November 21, 1989	Gekko	Y. Oshima	·	13 km	MPC · JPL
16459 Barth	1989 WE_{4}	Barth	November 28, 1989	Tautenburg Observatory	F. Börngen	NYS	5.0 km	MPC · JPL
16460	1989 YF_{1}	—	December 30, 1989	Siding Spring	R. H. McNaught	·	4.1 km	MPC · JPL
16461	1990 BO	—	January 21, 1990	Kushiro	S. Ueda, H. Kaneda	·	28 km	MPC · JPL
16462	1990 DZ_{1}	—	February 24, 1990	La Silla	H. Debehogne	V	4.4 km	MPC · JPL
16463 Nayoro	1990 EK	Nayoro	March 2, 1990	Kitami	K. Endate, K. Watanabe	·	5.3 km	MPC · JPL
16464	1990 EV_{1}	—	March 2, 1990	La Silla	E. W. Elst	·	8.1 km	MPC · JPL
16465 Basilrowe	1990 FV_{1}	Basilrowe	March 24, 1990	Palomar	J. E. Mueller	H	1.4 km	MPC · JPL
16466 Piyashiriyama	1990 FJ_{2}	Piyashiriyama	March 29, 1990	Kitami	K. Endate, K. Watanabe	EUN	10 km	MPC · JPL
16467	1990 FD_{3}	—	March 16, 1990	La Silla	H. Debehogne	(1118)	22 km	MPC · JPL
16468	1990 HW_{1}	—	April 27, 1990	Siding Spring	R. H. McNaught	MAR	5.0 km	MPC · JPL
16469	1990 KR	—	May 21, 1990	Palomar	E. F. Helin	·	3.5 km	MPC · JPL
16470	1990 OM_{2}	—	July 29, 1990	Palomar	H. E. Holt	·	3.2 km	MPC · JPL
16471	1990 OR_{3}	—	July 27, 1990	Palomar	H. E. Holt	·	3.8 km	MPC · JPL
16472	1990 OE_{5}	—	July 27, 1990	Palomar	H. E. Holt	DOR	10 km	MPC · JPL
16473	1990 QF_{2}	—	August 22, 1990	Palomar	H. E. Holt	KOR	5.9 km	MPC · JPL
16474	1990 QG_{3}	—	August 28, 1990	Palomar	H. E. Holt	·	1.3 km	MPC · JPL
16475	1990 QS_{4}	—	August 24, 1990	Palomar	H. E. Holt	·	4.4 km	MPC · JPL
16476	1990 QU_{4}	—	August 24, 1990	Palomar	H. E. Holt	(2076)	3.6 km	MPC · JPL
16477	1990 QH_{5}	—	August 25, 1990	Palomar	H. E. Holt	·	2.8 km	MPC · JPL
16478	1990 QS_{6}	—	August 20, 1990	La Silla	E. W. Elst	·	2.5 km	MPC · JPL
16479 Paulze	1990 QK_{7}	Paulze	August 20, 1990	La Silla	E. W. Elst	EOS	6.2 km	MPC · JPL
16480	1990 QN_{7}	—	August 20, 1990	La Silla	E. W. Elst	NYS · fast	2.9 km	MPC · JPL
16481 Thames	1990 QU_{7}	Thames	August 16, 1990	La Silla	E. W. Elst	·	13 km	MPC · JPL
16482	1990 QK_{8}	—	August 16, 1990	La Silla	E. W. Elst	·	4.7 km	MPC · JPL
16483	1990 QX_{8}	—	August 16, 1990	La Silla	E. W. Elst	KOR	5.1 km	MPC · JPL
16484	1990 QJ_{9}	—	August 16, 1990	La Silla	E. W. Elst	KOR	5.3 km	MPC · JPL
16485	1990 RG_{2}	—	September 14, 1990	Palomar	H. E. Holt	LIX	14 km	MPC · JPL
16486	1990 RM_{3}	—	September 14, 1990	Palomar	H. E. Holt	·	5.2 km	MPC · JPL
16487	1990 RV_{5}	—	September 8, 1990	La Silla	H. Debehogne	·	3.1 km	MPC · JPL
16488	1990 RX_{8}	—	September 13, 1990	Palomar	H. E. Holt	·	3.1 km	MPC · JPL
16489	1990 SG	—	September 17, 1990	Siding Spring	R. H. McNaught	fast	16 km	MPC · JPL
16490	1990 ST_{2}	—	September 18, 1990	Palomar	H. E. Holt	·	2.7 km	MPC · JPL
16491	1990 SA_{3}	—	September 18, 1990	Palomar	H. E. Holt	·	3.3 km	MPC · JPL
16492	1990 SQ_{5}	—	September 22, 1990	La Silla	E. W. Elst	·	6.9 km	MPC · JPL
16493	1990 SB_{6}	—	September 22, 1990	La Silla	E. W. Elst	KOR	4.6 km	MPC · JPL
16494 Oka	1990 SP_{8}	Oka	September 22, 1990	La Silla	E. W. Elst	EOS	8.8 km	MPC · JPL
16495	1990 SR_{8}	—	September 22, 1990	La Silla	E. W. Elst	·	2.1 km	MPC · JPL
16496	1990 SS_{8}	—	September 22, 1990	La Silla	E. W. Elst	EOS	6.3 km	MPC · JPL
16497 Toinevermeylen	1990 SU_{8}	Toinevermeylen	September 22, 1990	La Silla	E. W. Elst	·	3.6 km	MPC · JPL
16498 Passau	1990 SX_{8}	Passau	September 22, 1990	La Silla	E. W. Elst	WAT	6.6 km	MPC · JPL
16499	1990 SU_{9}	—	September 22, 1990	La Silla	E. W. Elst	·	3.3 km	MPC · JPL
16500	1990 SX_{10}	—	September 16, 1990	Palomar	H. E. Holt	·	5.3 km	MPC · JPL

== 16501–16600 ==
back to top

Designation			Discovery			Properties		Ref
Permanent	Provisional	Named after	Date	Site	Discoverer(s)	Category	Diam.	Ref
16501	1990 SX_{13}	—	September 23, 1990	La Silla	H. Debehogne	·	2.1 km	MPC · JPL
16502	1990 SB_{14}	—	September 23, 1990	La Silla	H. Debehogne	KOR	5.1 km	MPC · JPL
16503 Ayato	1990 TY	Ayato	October 15, 1990	Geisei	T. Seki	PHO	3.8 km	MPC · JPL
16504	1990 TR_{5}	—	October 9, 1990	Siding Spring	R. H. McNaught	·	2.9 km	MPC · JPL
16505 Sulzer	1990 TB_{13}	Sulzer	October 12, 1990	Tautenburg Observatory	F. Börngen, L. D. Schmadel	EOS	7.7 km	MPC · JPL
16506	1990 UH_{1}	—	October 20, 1990	Siding Spring	R. H. McNaught	·	8.1 km	MPC · JPL
16507 Fuuren	1990 UM_{2}	Fuuren	October 24, 1990	Kitami	K. Endate, K. Watanabe	EOS	8.7 km	MPC · JPL
16508	1990 UB_{3}	—	October 19, 1990	Dynic	A. Sugie	·	2.9 km	MPC · JPL
16509	1990 UE_{4}	—	October 16, 1990	La Silla	E. W. Elst	HYG	11 km	MPC · JPL
16510	1990 UL_{4}	—	October 16, 1990	La Silla	E. W. Elst	V	4.0 km	MPC · JPL
16511	1990 UR_{4}	—	October 16, 1990	La Silla	E. W. Elst	·	3.0 km	MPC · JPL
16512	1990 VQ_{4}	—	November 15, 1990	La Silla	E. W. Elst	·	3.1 km	MPC · JPL
16513 Vasks	1990 VP_{6}	Vasks	November 15, 1990	La Silla	E. W. Elst	·	7.8 km	MPC · JPL
16514 Stevelia	1990 VZ_{6}	Stevelia	November 11, 1990	Palomar	C. S. Shoemaker, D. H. Levy	·	7.6 km	MPC · JPL
16515 Usmanʹgrad	1990 VN_{14}	Usmanʹgrad	November 15, 1990	Nauchnij	L. I. Chernykh	THM	11 km	MPC · JPL
16516 Efremlevitan	1990 VR_{14}	Efremlevitan	November 15, 1990	Nauchnij	L. I. Chernykh	·	6.4 km	MPC · JPL
16517	1990 WD	—	November 19, 1990	Siding Spring	R. H. McNaught	·	4.2 km	MPC · JPL
16518 Akihikoito	1990 WF	Akihikoito	November 16, 1990	Okutama	Hioki, T., Hayakawa, S.	·	4.9 km	MPC · JPL
16519	1990 WV	—	November 18, 1990	La Silla	E. W. Elst	·	2.8 km	MPC · JPL
16520	1990 WO_{3}	—	November 21, 1990	La Silla	E. W. Elst	(1338) (FLO)	2.9 km	MPC · JPL
16521	1990 WR_{5}	—	November 18, 1990	La Silla	E. W. Elst	TEL	5.8 km	MPC · JPL
16522 Tell	1991 AJ_{3}	Tell	January 15, 1991	Tautenburg Observatory	F. Börngen	URS	13 km	MPC · JPL
16523	1991 BP	—	January 19, 1991	Dynic	A. Sugie	EUN	5.5 km	MPC · JPL
16524 Hausmann	1991 BB_{3}	Hausmann	January 17, 1991	Tautenburg Observatory	F. Börngen	NYS	2.9 km	MPC · JPL
16525 Shumarinaiko	1991 CU_{2}	Shumarinaiko	February 14, 1991	Kitami	K. Endate, K. Watanabe	NYS · moon	5.3 km	MPC · JPL
16526	1991 DC	—	February 17, 1991	Yorii	M. Arai, H. Mori	·	4.1 km	MPC · JPL
16527	1991 DH_{1}	—	February 18, 1991	Palomar	E. F. Helin	·	7.5 km	MPC · JPL
16528 Terakado	1991 GV	Terakado	April 2, 1991	Kitami	K. Endate, K. Watanabe	·	8.2 km	MPC · JPL
16529 Dangoldin	1991 GO_{1}	Dangoldin	April 9, 1991	Palomar	E. F. Helin	·	7.0 km	MPC · JPL
16530	1991 GR_{7}	—	April 8, 1991	La Silla	E. W. Elst	·	4.3 km	MPC · JPL
16531	1991 GO_{8}	—	April 8, 1991	La Silla	E. W. Elst	·	3.4 km	MPC · JPL
16532	1991 LY	—	June 14, 1991	Palomar	E. F. Helin	·	6.7 km	MPC · JPL
16533	1991 LA_{1}	—	June 14, 1991	Palomar	E. F. Helin	EUN	4.8 km	MPC · JPL
16534	1991 NB_{1}	—	July 10, 1991	Palomar	E. F. Helin	·	4.1 km	MPC · JPL
16535	1991 NF_{3}	—	July 4, 1991	La Silla	H. Debehogne	EUN	6.2 km	MPC · JPL
16536	1991 PV_{1}	—	August 10, 1991	La Silla	E. W. Elst	·	6.0 km	MPC · JPL
16537	1991 PF_{11}	—	August 8, 1991	Palomar	H. E. Holt	GEF	5.7 km	MPC · JPL
16538	1991 PO_{12}	—	August 5, 1991	Palomar	H. E. Holt	·	3.9 km	MPC · JPL
16539	1991 PY_{12}	—	August 5, 1991	Palomar	H. E. Holt	EUN	5.6 km	MPC · JPL
16540	1991 PO_{16}	—	August 7, 1991	Palomar	H. E. Holt	EUN	5.9 km	MPC · JPL
16541	1991 PW_{18}	—	August 8, 1991	Palomar	H. E. Holt	KOR	8.5 km	MPC · JPL
16542	1991 PK_{31}	—	August 14, 1991	La Silla	E. W. Elst	·	10 km	MPC · JPL
16543 Rosetta	1991 RC_{2}	Rosetta	September 5, 1991	Haute Provence	E. W. Elst	·	3.8 km	MPC · JPL
16544 Hochlehnert	1991 RA_{3}	Hochlehnert	September 9, 1991	Tautenburg Observatory	L. D. Schmadel, F. Börngen	(16286)	5.4 km	MPC · JPL
16545	1991 RN_{4}	—	September 9, 1991	Kiyosato	S. Otomo	·	4.8 km	MPC · JPL
16546	1991 RP_{5}	—	September 13, 1991	Palomar	H. E. Holt	·	19 km	MPC · JPL
16547	1991 RS_{7}	—	September 7, 1991	Palomar	E. F. Helin	·	7.6 km	MPC · JPL
16548	1991 RR_{9}	—	September 10, 1991	Palomar	H. E. Holt	·	3.2 km	MPC · JPL
16549	1991 RE_{10}	—	September 12, 1991	Palomar	H. E. Holt	DOR	13 km	MPC · JPL
16550	1991 RB_{13}	—	September 10, 1991	Palomar	H. E. Holt	DOR	8.7 km	MPC · JPL
16551	1991 RT_{14}	—	September 15, 1991	Palomar	H. E. Holt	·	7.8 km	MPC · JPL
16552 Sawamura	1991 SB	Sawamura	September 16, 1991	Kitami	K. Endate, K. Watanabe	·	7.3 km	MPC · JPL
16553	1991 TL_{14}	—	October 7, 1991	Palomar	C. P. de Saint-Aignan	·	2.3 km	MPC · JPL
16554	1991 UE_{2}	—	October 29, 1991	Kushiro	S. Ueda, H. Kaneda	(5)	7.6 km	MPC · JPL
16555 Nagaomasami	1991 US_{3}	Nagaomasami	October 31, 1991	Kitami	K. Endate, K. Watanabe	MAR	6.6 km	MPC · JPL
16556	1991 VQ_{1}	—	November 4, 1991	Kushiro	S. Ueda, H. Kaneda	·	5.2 km	MPC · JPL
16557	1991 VE_{2}	—	November 9, 1991	Kushiro	S. Ueda, H. Kaneda	·	5.6 km	MPC · JPL
16558	1991 VQ_{2}	—	November 1, 1991	Palomar	E. F. Helin	PHO · slow	5.7 km	MPC · JPL
16559	1991 VA_{3}	—	November 9, 1991	Dynic	A. Sugie	EUN · slow	6.5 km	MPC · JPL
16560 Daitor	1991 VZ_{5}	Daitor	November 2, 1991	La Silla	E. W. Elst	L5	44 km	MPC · JPL
16561 Rawls	1991 VP_{7}	Rawls	November 3, 1991	Kitt Peak	Spacewatch	fast	6.9 km	MPC · JPL
16562	1992 AV_{1}	—	January 9, 1992	Palomar	E. F. Helin	H	2.7 km	MPC · JPL
16563 Ob	1992 BF_{2}	Ob	January 30, 1992	La Silla	E. W. Elst	·	16 km	MPC · JPL
16564 Coriolis	1992 BK_{2}	Coriolis	January 30, 1992	La Silla	E. W. Elst	EOS	6.4 km	MPC · JPL
16565	1992 CZ_{1}	—	February 12, 1992	Mérida	Naranjo, O. A., J. Stock	·	16 km	MPC · JPL
16566	1992 CZ_{2}	—	February 2, 1992	La Silla	E. W. Elst	·	3.2 km	MPC · JPL
16567	1992 CQ_{3}	—	February 2, 1992	La Silla	E. W. Elst	·	2.6 km	MPC · JPL
16568	1992 DX_{5}	—	February 29, 1992	La Silla	UESAC	THM	11 km	MPC · JPL
16569	1992 DA_{10}	—	February 29, 1992	La Silla	UESAC	HYG	10 km	MPC · JPL
16570	1992 DE_{11}	—	February 29, 1992	La Silla	UESAC	NYS ·	4.4 km	MPC · JPL
16571	1992 EE	—	March 2, 1992	Kushiro	S. Ueda, H. Kaneda	·	5.9 km	MPC · JPL
16572	1992 EU_{5}	—	March 2, 1992	La Silla	UESAC	·	12 km	MPC · JPL
16573	1992 EC_{10}	—	March 2, 1992	La Silla	UESAC	EOS	9.8 km	MPC · JPL
16574	1992 EU_{10}	—	March 6, 1992	La Silla	UESAC	·	2.7 km	MPC · JPL
16575	1992 EH_{11}	—	March 6, 1992	La Silla	UESAC	THM	9.4 km	MPC · JPL
16576	1992 EY_{11}	—	March 6, 1992	La Silla	UESAC	THM	9.1 km	MPC · JPL
16577	1992 ET_{23}	—	March 2, 1992	La Silla	UESAC	·	2.4 km	MPC · JPL
16578 Essjayess	1992 FM_{1}	Essjayess	March 29, 1992	Siding Spring	D. I. Steel	PHO	4.3 km	MPC · JPL
16579	1992 GO	—	April 3, 1992	Kushiro	S. Ueda, H. Kaneda	EUN	7.2 km	MPC · JPL
16580	1992 HA	—	April 21, 1992	Kiyosato	S. Otomo	V	2.7 km	MPC · JPL
16581	1992 JF_{3}	—	May 8, 1992	La Silla	H. Debehogne	NYS	3.5 km	MPC · JPL
16582	1992 JS_{3}	—	May 11, 1992	La Silla	H. Debehogne	·	5.9 km	MPC · JPL
16583 Oersted	1992 OH_{2}	Oersted	July 26, 1992	La Silla	E. W. Elst	·	22 km	MPC · JPL
16584	1992 PM	—	August 8, 1992	Caussols	E. W. Elst	NYS ·	6.8 km	MPC · JPL
16585	1992 QR	—	August 23, 1992	Palomar	H. E. Holt	H	1.9 km	MPC · JPL
16586	1992 RZ_{6}	—	September 2, 1992	La Silla	E. W. Elst	(5)	2.2 km	MPC · JPL
16587 Nagamori	1992 SE	Nagamori	September 21, 1992	Kitami	K. Endate, K. Watanabe	·	7.5 km	MPC · JPL
16588 Johngee	1992 ST	Johngee	September 23, 1992	Palomar	E. F. Helin	·	2.9 km	MPC · JPL
16589 Hastrup	1992 SL_{1}	Hastrup	September 24, 1992	Palomar	E. F. Helin	H · slow	2.2 km	MPC · JPL
16590 Brunowalter	1992 SM_{2}	Brunowalter	September 21, 1992	Tautenburg Observatory	F. Börngen, L. D. Schmadel	EUN	4.7 km	MPC · JPL
16591	1992 SY_{17}	—	September 30, 1992	Palomar	H. E. Holt	·	3.9 km	MPC · JPL
16592	1992 TM_{1}	—	October 3, 1992	Palomar	H. E. Holt	EUN · slow	11 km	MPC · JPL
16593	1992 UB_{3}	—	October 25, 1992	Okutama	Hioki, T., Hayakawa, S.	·	14 km	MPC · JPL
16594 Sorachi	1992 UL_{4}	Sorachi	October 26, 1992	Kitami	K. Endate, K. Watanabe	·	7.8 km	MPC · JPL
16595	1992 UU_{6}	—	October 20, 1992	Palomar	H. E. Holt	EUN	5.4 km	MPC · JPL
16596 Stephenstrauss	1992 UN_{7}	Stephenstrauss	October 18, 1992	Kitt Peak	Spacewatch	NYS	4.8 km	MPC · JPL
16597	1992 YU_{1}	—	December 18, 1992	Caussols	E. W. Elst	·	11 km	MPC · JPL
16598 Brugmansia	1992 YC_{2}	Brugmansia	December 18, 1992	Caussols	E. W. Elst	·	4.8 km	MPC · JPL
16599 Shorland	1993 BR_{2}	Shorland	January 20, 1993	Yatsugatake	Y. Kushida, O. Muramatsu	·	10 km	MPC · JPL
16600	1993 DQ	—	February 21, 1993	Kushiro	S. Ueda, H. Kaneda	·	3.4 km	MPC · JPL

== 16601–16700 ==
back to top

Designation			Discovery			Properties		Ref
Permanent	Provisional	Named after	Date	Site	Discoverer(s)	Category	Diam.	Ref
16601	1993 FQ_{1}	—	March 25, 1993	Kushiro	S. Ueda, H. Kaneda	V	3.4 km	MPC · JPL
16602 Anabuki	1993 FY_{3}	Anabuki	March 17, 1993	Geisei	T. Seki	·	3.8 km	MPC · JPL
16603	1993 FG_{6}	—	March 17, 1993	La Silla	UESAC	·	8.2 km	MPC · JPL
16604	1993 FQ_{10}	—	March 17, 1993	La Silla	UESAC	EOS	6.8 km	MPC · JPL
16605	1993 FR_{10}	—	March 17, 1993	La Silla	UESAC	·	4.1 km	MPC · JPL
16606	1993 FH_{11}	—	March 17, 1993	La Silla	UESAC	·	4.9 km	MPC · JPL
16607	1993 FN_{12}	—	March 17, 1993	La Silla	UESAC	HYG	8.9 km	MPC · JPL
16608	1993 FA_{23}	—	March 21, 1993	La Silla	UESAC	·	7.1 km	MPC · JPL
16609	1993 FB_{23}	—	March 21, 1993	La Silla	UESAC	·	8.1 km	MPC · JPL
16610	1993 FV_{23}	—	March 21, 1993	La Silla	UESAC	·	5.5 km	MPC · JPL
16611	1993 FY_{23}	—	March 21, 1993	La Silla	UESAC	·	7.3 km	MPC · JPL
16612	1993 FF_{25}	—	March 21, 1993	La Silla	UESAC	(2076)	2.6 km	MPC · JPL
16613	1993 FD_{28}	—	March 21, 1993	La Silla	UESAC	·	6.8 km	MPC · JPL
16614	1993 FS_{35}	—	March 19, 1993	La Silla	UESAC	·	11 km	MPC · JPL
16615	1993 FW_{40}	—	March 19, 1993	La Silla	UESAC	THM	7.0 km	MPC · JPL
16616	1993 FB_{44}	—	March 19, 1993	La Silla	UESAC	KOR	5.5 km	MPC · JPL
16617	1993 FC_{48}	—	March 19, 1993	La Silla	UESAC	·	2.4 km	MPC · JPL
16618	1993 FX_{52}	—	March 17, 1993	La Silla	UESAC	·	2.0 km	MPC · JPL
16619	1993 FR_{58}	—	March 19, 1993	La Silla	UESAC	·	7.0 km	MPC · JPL
16620	1993 FE_{78}	—	March 21, 1993	La Silla	UESAC	THM	6.8 km	MPC · JPL
16621	1993 FA_{84}	—	March 23, 1993	La Silla	UESAC	GEF	4.0 km	MPC · JPL
16622	1993 GG_{1}	—	April 15, 1993	Palomar	H. E. Holt	HYG	11 km	MPC · JPL
16623 Muenzel	1993 GM_{1}	Muenzel	April 14, 1993	La Silla	H. Debehogne	HYG	12 km	MPC · JPL
16624 Hoshizawa	1993 HX	Hoshizawa	April 16, 1993	Kitami	K. Endate, K. Watanabe	·	6.2 km	MPC · JPL
16625 Kunitsugu	1993 HG_{1}	Kunitsugu	April 20, 1993	Kitami	K. Endate, K. Watanabe	·	4.0 km	MPC · JPL
16626 Thumper	1993 HJ_{3}	Thumper	April 20, 1993	Kitt Peak	Spacewatch	KOR	5.7 km	MPC · JPL
16627	1993 JK	—	May 14, 1993	Kushiro	S. Ueda, H. Kaneda	·	3.7 km	MPC · JPL
16628	1993 KF	—	May 16, 1993	Kiyosato	S. Otomo	EOS	12 km	MPC · JPL
16629	1993 LK_{1}	—	June 15, 1993	Palomar	H. E. Holt	·	3.3 km	MPC · JPL
16630	1993 NZ_{1}	—	July 12, 1993	La Silla	E. W. Elst	EOS	10 km	MPC · JPL
16631	1993 OY_{3}	—	July 20, 1993	La Silla	E. W. Elst	·	3.2 km	MPC · JPL
16632	1993 OH_{4}	—	July 20, 1993	La Silla	E. W. Elst	·	1.9 km	MPC · JPL
16633	1993 OV_{5}	—	July 20, 1993	La Silla	E. W. Elst	·	1.8 km	MPC · JPL
16634	1993 OD_{8}	—	July 20, 1993	La Silla	E. W. Elst	·	2.3 km	MPC · JPL
16635	1993 QO	—	August 20, 1993	Palomar	E. F. Helin	PHO · moon	3.1 km	MPC · JPL
16636	1993 QP	—	August 23, 1993	Palomar	E. F. Helin, K. J. Lawrence	AMO	620 m	MPC · JPL
16637	1993 QP_{2}	—	August 16, 1993	Caussols	E. W. Elst	·	2.7 km	MPC · JPL
16638	1993 QN_{3}	—	August 18, 1993	Caussols	E. W. Elst	·	7.6 km	MPC · JPL
16639	1993 QD_{4}	—	August 18, 1993	Caussols	E. W. Elst	·	4.1 km	MPC · JPL
16640	1993 QU_{9}	—	August 20, 1993	La Silla	E. W. Elst	·	2.5 km	MPC · JPL
16641 Esteban	1993 QH_{10}	Esteban	August 16, 1993	Palomar	C. S. Shoemaker, E. M. Shoemaker	PHO	5.7 km	MPC · JPL
16642	1993 RK_{4}	—	September 15, 1993	La Silla	E. W. Elst	NYS	2.7 km	MPC · JPL
16643	1993 RV_{15}	—	September 15, 1993	La Silla	H. Debehogne, E. W. Elst	·	7.7 km	MPC · JPL
16644 Otemaedaigaku	1993 SH_{1}	Otemaedaigaku	September 16, 1993	Kitami	K. Endate, K. Watanabe	V	3.5 km	MPC · JPL
16645 Aldalara	1993 SP_{3}	Aldalara	September 22, 1993	Mérida	Naranjo, O. A.	·	4.0 km	MPC · JPL
16646 Sparrman	1993 SJ_{5}	Sparrman	September 19, 1993	Caussols	E. W. Elst	V	3.8 km	MPC · JPL
16647 Robbydesmet	1993 SQ_{6}	Robbydesmet	September 17, 1993	La Silla	E. W. Elst	·	3.4 km	MPC · JPL
16648 Hossi	1993 SH_{7}	Hossi	September 17, 1993	La Silla	E. W. Elst	·	3.3 km	MPC · JPL
16649 Masayasu	1993 TY_{1}	Masayasu	October 15, 1993	Kitami	K. Endate, K. Watanabe	V	2.6 km	MPC · JPL
16650 Sakushingakuin	1993 TE_{3}	Sakushingakuin	October 11, 1993	Kitami	K. Endate, K. Watanabe	·	4.6 km	MPC · JPL
16651	1993 TS_{11}	—	October 13, 1993	Palomar	H. E. Holt	·	3.0 km	MPC · JPL
16652	1993 TT_{12}	—	October 13, 1993	Palomar	H. E. Holt	·	4.3 km	MPC · JPL
16653	1993 TP_{19}	—	October 9, 1993	La Silla	E. W. Elst	V	3.8 km	MPC · JPL
16654	1993 TY_{29}	—	October 9, 1993	La Silla	E. W. Elst	·	3.4 km	MPC · JPL
16655	1993 TS_{33}	—	October 9, 1993	La Silla	E. W. Elst	·	2.7 km	MPC · JPL
16656	1993 TP_{37}	—	October 9, 1993	La Silla	E. W. Elst	·	2.2 km	MPC · JPL
16657	1993 UB	—	October 23, 1993	Siding Spring	R. H. McNaught	AMO +1km	1.7 km	MPC · JPL
16658	1993 UD_{1}	—	October 26, 1993	Farra d'Isonzo	Farra d'Isonzo	·	2.0 km	MPC · JPL
16659	1993 UH_{1}	—	October 19, 1993	Palomar	E. F. Helin	PHO	4.2 km	MPC · JPL
16660	1993 US_{7}	—	October 20, 1993	La Silla	E. W. Elst	V	3.7 km	MPC · JPL
16661	1993 VS_{1}	—	November 11, 1993	Kushiro	S. Ueda, H. Kaneda	·	4.7 km	MPC · JPL
16662	1993 VU_{1}	—	November 11, 1993	Kushiro	S. Ueda, H. Kaneda	·	12 km	MPC · JPL
16663	1993 VG_{4}	—	November 11, 1993	Kushiro	S. Ueda, H. Kaneda	EOS	10 km	MPC · JPL
16664	1993 VO_{4}	—	November 9, 1993	Caussols	E. W. Elst	·	7.4 km	MPC · JPL
16665	1993 XK	—	December 8, 1993	Oizumi	T. Kobayashi	·	3.0 km	MPC · JPL
16666 Liroma	1993 XL_{1}	Liroma	December 7, 1993	Palomar	C. S. Shoemaker	PHO	6.8 km	MPC · JPL
16667	1993 XM_{1}	—	December 10, 1993	Kitt Peak	Spacewatch	L5	35 km	MPC · JPL
16668	1993 XN_{1}	—	December 15, 1993	Oizumi	T. Kobayashi	·	6.2 km	MPC · JPL
16669 Rionuevo	1993 XK_{3}	Rionuevo	December 8, 1993	Palomar	C. S. Shoemaker, D. H. Levy	H ·	4.0 km	MPC · JPL
16670	1994 AS_{2}	—	January 14, 1994	Oizumi	T. Kobayashi	NYS	4.4 km	MPC · JPL
16671 Tago	1994 AF_{3}	Tago	January 13, 1994	Kitami	K. Endate, K. Watanabe	·	20 km	MPC · JPL
16672 Bedini	1994 BA_{1}	Bedini	January 17, 1994	Cima Ekar	A. Boattini, M. Tombelli	·	3.1 km	MPC · JPL
16673	1994 BF_{1}	—	January 23, 1994	Oizumi	T. Kobayashi	·	3.8 km	MPC · JPL
16674 Birkeland	1994 BK_{3}	Birkeland	January 16, 1994	Caussols	E. W. Elst, C. Pollas	·	6.0 km	MPC · JPL
16675 Torii	1994 CY_{1}	Torii	February 8, 1994	Kitami	K. Endate, K. Watanabe	·	5.6 km	MPC · JPL
16676 Tinne	1994 CA_{5}	Tinne	February 11, 1994	Kitt Peak	Spacewatch	(5)	4.5 km	MPC · JPL
16677	1994 CT_{11}	—	February 7, 1994	La Silla	E. W. Elst	·	6.1 km	MPC · JPL
16678	1994 CC_{18}	—	February 8, 1994	La Silla	E. W. Elst	EUN	3.0 km	MPC · JPL
16679	1994 EQ_{2}	—	March 14, 1994	Kiyosato	S. Otomo	GEF	6.5 km	MPC · JPL
16680 Minamitanemachi	1994 EP_{3}	Minamitanemachi	March 14, 1994	Kitami	K. Endate, K. Watanabe	·	8.0 km	MPC · JPL
16681	1994 EV_{7}	—	March 11, 1994	Palomar	E. F. Helin	H	4.3 km	MPC · JPL
16682 Donati	1994 FB	Donati	March 18, 1994	Sormano	M. Cavagna, Giuliani, V.	·	2.2 km	MPC · JPL
16683 Alepieri	1994 JY	Alepieri	May 3, 1994	San Marcello	L. Tesi, G. Cattani	·	11 km	MPC · JPL
16684	1994 JQ_{1}	—	May 11, 1994	La Palma	M. J. Irwin, A. Żytkow	cubewano (cold)	155 km	MPC · JPL
16685	1994 JU_{8}	—	May 8, 1994	Kiyosato	S. Otomo	·	8.0 km	MPC · JPL
16686	1994 PL_{9}	—	August 10, 1994	La Silla	E. W. Elst	EOS	10 km	MPC · JPL
16687	1994 PN_{20}	—	August 12, 1994	La Silla	E. W. Elst	MAS	1.6 km	MPC · JPL
16688	1994 PN_{21}	—	August 12, 1994	La Silla	E. W. Elst	THM	9.5 km	MPC · JPL
16689 Vistula	1994 PZ_{26}	Vistula	August 12, 1994	La Silla	E. W. Elst	·	10 km	MPC · JPL
16690 Fabritius	1994 UR_{6}	Fabritius	October 28, 1994	Kitt Peak	Spacewatch	·	2.6 km	MPC · JPL
16691	1994 VS	—	November 3, 1994	Oizumi	T. Kobayashi	·	2.7 km	MPC · JPL
16692	1994 VO_{1}	—	November 3, 1994	Oizumi	T. Kobayashi	·	1.9 km	MPC · JPL
16693 Moseley	1994 YC_{2}	Moseley	December 26, 1994	Siding Spring	D. J. Asher	EUN	5.5 km	MPC · JPL
16694	1995 AJ	—	January 2, 1995	Oizumi	T. Kobayashi	moon	4.1 km	MPC · JPL
16695 Terryhandley	1995 AM	Terryhandley	January 7, 1995	Kitt Peak	Spacewatch	·	1.3 km	MPC · JPL
16696 Villamayor	1995 BE_{7}	Villamayor	January 28, 1995	Kitt Peak	Spacewatch	NYS	4.3 km	MPC · JPL
16697	1995 CQ	—	February 1, 1995	Kiyosato	S. Otomo	·	3.2 km	MPC · JPL
16698	1995 CX	—	February 3, 1995	Oizumi	T. Kobayashi	PHO	8.2 km	MPC · JPL
16699	1995 DC	—	February 20, 1995	Oizumi	T. Kobayashi	·	3.6 km	MPC · JPL
16700 Seiwa	1995 DZ	Seiwa	February 22, 1995	Oizumi	T. Kobayashi	·	2.8 km	MPC · JPL

== 16701–16800 ==
back to top

Designation			Discovery			Properties		Ref
Permanent	Provisional	Named after	Date	Site	Discoverer(s)	Category	Diam.	Ref
16701 Volpe	1995 DH_{4}	Volpe	February 21, 1995	Kitt Peak	Spacewatch	·	3.0 km	MPC · JPL
16702 Buxner	1995 DZ_{8}	Buxner	February 24, 1995	Kitt Peak	Spacewatch	NYS ·	5.0 km	MPC · JPL
16703 Richardstrauss	1995 ER_{7}	Richardstrauss	March 2, 1995	Kitt Peak	Spacewatch	·	3.1 km	MPC · JPL
16704 Taisukekaneko	1995 ED_{8}	Taisukekaneko	March 7, 1995	Nyukasa	M. Hirasawa, S. Suzuki	PHO	5.0 km	MPC · JPL
16705 Reinhardt	1995 EO_{8}	Reinhardt	March 4, 1995	Tautenburg Observatory	F. Börngen	·	3.2 km	MPC · JPL
16706 Svojsík	1995 OE_{1}	Svojsík	July 30, 1995	Ondřejov	P. Pravec	KOR	3.3 km	MPC · JPL
16707 Norman	1995 QP_{10}	Norman	August 19, 1995	La Silla	C.-I. Lagerkvist	·	6.1 km	MPC · JPL
16708	1995 SP_{1}	—	September 21, 1995	Catalina Station	T. B. Spahr	EUP	15 km	MPC · JPL
16709 Auratian	1995 SH_{5}	Auratian	September 29, 1995	Kleť	J. Tichá	·	4.6 km	MPC · JPL
16710 Kluyver	1995 SL_{20}	Kluyver	September 18, 1995	Kitt Peak	Spacewatch	·	2.4 km	MPC · JPL
16711 Ka-Dar	1995 SM_{29}	Ka-Dar	September 26, 1995	Zelenchukskaya	T. V. Krjačko	·	12 km	MPC · JPL
16712	1995 SW_{29}	—	September 30, 1995	Catalina Station	C. W. Hergenrother	EUP	17 km	MPC · JPL
16713 Airashi	1995 SV_{52}	Airashi	September 20, 1995	Kitami	K. Endate, K. Watanabe	(1298)	14 km	MPC · JPL
16714 Arndt	1995 SM_{54}	Arndt	September 21, 1995	Tautenburg Observatory	F. Börngen	KOR	6.6 km	MPC · JPL
16715 Trettenero	1995 UN_{5}	Trettenero	October 20, 1995	Bologna	San Vittore	LIX	9.0 km	MPC · JPL
16716	1995 UX_{6}	—	October 21, 1995	Chichibu	N. Satō, T. Urata	THM	5.6 km	MPC · JPL
16717	1995 UJ_{8}	—	October 27, 1995	Oizumi	T. Kobayashi	·	9.9 km	MPC · JPL
16718 Morikawa	1995 UA_{9}	Morikawa	October 30, 1995	Kitami	K. Endate, K. Watanabe	·	13 km	MPC · JPL
16719 Mizokami	1995 UF_{45}	Mizokami	October 28, 1995	Kitami	K. Endate, K. Watanabe	THM	10 km	MPC · JPL
16720	1995 WT	—	November 17, 1995	Oizumi	T. Kobayashi	·	9.1 km	MPC · JPL
16721	1995 WF_{3}	—	November 16, 1995	Kushiro	S. Ueda, H. Kaneda	·	6.2 km	MPC · JPL
16722	1995 WG_{7}	—	November 24, 1995	Nachi-Katsuura	Y. Shimizu, T. Urata	·	12 km	MPC · JPL
16723 Fumiofuke	1995 WX_{8}	Fumiofuke	November 27, 1995	Chichibu	N. Satō, T. Urata	THM	6.8 km	MPC · JPL
16724 Ullilotzmann	1995 YV_{3}	Ullilotzmann	December 28, 1995	Kitt Peak	Spacewatch	·	7.6 km	MPC · JPL
16725 Toudono	1996 CE_{3}	Toudono	February 15, 1996	Nanyo	T. Okuni	HNS	7.5 km	MPC · JPL
16726	1996 DC	—	February 18, 1996	Oizumi	T. Kobayashi	·	3.5 km	MPC · JPL
16727	1996 EK_{2}	—	March 15, 1996	Haleakala	NEAT	·	2.6 km	MPC · JPL
16728	1996 GB_{18}	—	April 15, 1996	La Silla	E. W. Elst	·	2.7 km	MPC · JPL
16729	1996 GA_{19}	—	April 15, 1996	La Silla	E. W. Elst	·	2.9 km	MPC · JPL
16730 Nijisseiki	1996 HJ_{1}	Nijisseiki	April 17, 1996	Saji	Saji	·	2.3 km	MPC · JPL
16731 Mitsumata	1996 HK_{1}	Mitsumata	April 17, 1996	Saji	Saji	·	2.1 km	MPC · JPL
16732	1996 HZ_{16}	—	April 18, 1996	La Silla	E. W. Elst	·	3.9 km	MPC · JPL
16733	1996 HM_{22}	—	April 22, 1996	Haleakala	NEAT	·	2.2 km	MPC · JPL
16734	1996 HZ_{22}	—	April 20, 1996	La Silla	E. W. Elst	·	3.3 km	MPC · JPL
16735	1996 JJ	—	May 8, 1996	Kushiro	S. Ueda, H. Kaneda	·	3.0 km	MPC · JPL
16736 Tongariyama	1996 JW_{2}	Tongariyama	May 13, 1996	Nanyo	T. Okuni	·	5.1 km	MPC · JPL
16737	1996 KN_{1}	—	May 24, 1996	Višnjan Observatory	Višnjan	V	2.7 km	MPC · JPL
16738	1996 KQ_{1}	—	May 19, 1996	Xinglong	SCAP	·	4.0 km	MPC · JPL
16739	1996 KX_{2}	—	May 24, 1996	Xinglong	SCAP	·	6.1 km	MPC · JPL
16740 Kipthorne	1996 KT_{8}	Kipthorne	May 22, 1996	La Silla	E. W. Elst	·	3.0 km	MPC · JPL
16741	1996 NZ_{3}	—	July 14, 1996	La Silla	E. W. Elst	·	4.1 km	MPC · JPL
16742 Zink	1996 ON	Zink	July 21, 1996	Kleť	J. Tichá, M. Tichý	ERI	4.4 km	MPC · JPL
16743	1996 OQ	—	July 21, 1996	Haleakala	NEAT	NYS	4.8 km	MPC · JPL
16744 Antonioleone	1996 OJ_{2}	Antonioleone	July 23, 1996	San Marcello	L. Tesi	·	2.8 km	MPC · JPL
16745 Zappa	1996 PF_{5}	Zappa	August 9, 1996	Bologna	San Vittore	·	6.2 km	MPC · JPL
16746	1996 PW_{6}	—	August 8, 1996	Nachi-Katsuura	Shiozawa, H., T. Urata	·	2.8 km	MPC · JPL
16747	1996 PS_{8}	—	August 8, 1996	La Silla	E. W. Elst	·	4.1 km	MPC · JPL
16748	1996 PD_{9}	—	August 8, 1996	La Silla	E. W. Elst	KOR	4.4 km	MPC · JPL
16749 Vospini	1996 QE	Vospini	August 16, 1996	Sormano	P. Sicoli, Giuliani, V.	·	5.6 km	MPC · JPL
16750 Marisandoz	1996 QL	Marisandoz	August 18, 1996	Lime Creek	R. Linderholm	·	6.8 km	MPC · JPL
16751	1996 QG_{1}	—	August 18, 1996	Nachi-Katsuura	Y. Shimizu, T. Urata	·	3.3 km	MPC · JPL
16752	1996 QP_{1}	—	August 22, 1996	Nachi-Katsuura	Y. Shimizu, T. Urata	·	3.0 km	MPC · JPL
16753	1996 QS_{1}	—	August 21, 1996	Church Stretton	S. P. Laurie	V	3.0 km	MPC · JPL
16754	1996 RW	—	September 10, 1996	Haleakala	NEAT	·	3.8 km	MPC · JPL
16755 Cayley	1996 RE_{1}	Cayley	September 9, 1996	Prescott	P. G. Comba	·	3.7 km	MPC · JPL
16756 Keuskamp	1996 RQ_{11}	Keuskamp	September 8, 1996	Kitt Peak	Spacewatch	·	4.0 km	MPC · JPL
16757 Luoxiahong	1996 SC_{6}	Luoxiahong	September 18, 1996	Xinglong	SCAP	·	4.8 km	MPC · JPL
16758	1996 TR_{1}	—	October 3, 1996	Xinglong	SCAP	·	7.2 km	MPC · JPL
16759 Furuyama	1996 TJ_{7}	Furuyama	October 10, 1996	Kuma Kogen	A. Nakamura	MRX	2.2 km	MPC · JPL
16760 Masanori	1996 TY_{7}	Masanori	October 11, 1996	Yatsuka	H. Abe	(5)	4.3 km	MPC · JPL
16761 Hertz	1996 TE_{8}	Hertz	October 3, 1996	Pianoro	V. Goretti	·	5.8 km	MPC · JPL
16762	1996 TK_{10}	—	October 9, 1996	Kushiro	S. Ueda, H. Kaneda	·	2.4 km	MPC · JPL
16763	1996 TG_{12}	—	October 3, 1996	Xinglong	SCAP	·	3.8 km	MPC · JPL
16764	1996 TV_{14}	—	October 9, 1996	Nanyo	T. Okuni	KOR	4.1 km	MPC · JPL
16765 Agnesi	1996 UA	Agnesi	October 16, 1996	Prescott	P. G. Comba	·	4.1 km	MPC · JPL
16766 Righi	1996 UP	Righi	October 18, 1996	Pianoro	V. Goretti	GEF	6.3 km	MPC · JPL
16767	1996 US	—	October 16, 1996	Nachi-Katsuura	Y. Shimizu, T. Urata	(5)	3.4 km	MPC · JPL
16768	1996 UA_{1}	—	October 20, 1996	Oizumi	T. Kobayashi	·	10 km	MPC · JPL
16769	1996 UN_{1}	—	October 29, 1996	Toyama	M. Aoki	MAR	5.0 km	MPC · JPL
16770 Angkor Wat	1996 UD_{3}	Angkor Wat	October 30, 1996	Colleverde	V. S. Casulli	PAD	6.5 km	MPC · JPL
16771	1996 UQ_{3}	—	October 19, 1996	Church Stretton	S. P. Laurie	ADE	10 km	MPC · JPL
16772	1996 UC_{4}	—	October 29, 1996	Xinglong	SCAP	·	5.1 km	MPC · JPL
16773	1996 VO_{1}	—	November 6, 1996	Nachi-Katsuura	Y. Shimizu, T. Urata	EUN	7.5 km	MPC · JPL
16774	1996 VP_{1}	—	November 6, 1996	Nachi-Katsuura	Y. Shimizu, T. Urata	·	7.8 km	MPC · JPL
16775	1996 VB_{6}	—	November 15, 1996	Oizumi	T. Kobayashi	KOR	5.7 km	MPC · JPL
16776	1996 VA_{8}	—	November 3, 1996	Kushiro	S. Ueda, H. Kaneda	·	3.9 km	MPC · JPL
16777 Bosma	1996 VD_{29}	Bosma	November 13, 1996	Kitt Peak	Spacewatch	·	8.9 km	MPC · JPL
16778	1996 WU_{1}	—	November 30, 1996	Oizumi	T. Kobayashi	EOS	6.2 km	MPC · JPL
16779 Mittelman	1996 WH_{2}	Mittelman	November 30, 1996	Sudbury	D. di Cicco	EUN	5.4 km	MPC · JPL
16780	1996 XT_{1}	—	December 2, 1996	Oizumi	T. Kobayashi	KOR	4.5 km	MPC · JPL
16781 Renčín	1996 XU_{18}	Renčín	December 12, 1996	Kleť	M. Tichý, Z. Moravec	THM	10 km	MPC · JPL
16782	1996 XC_{19}	—	December 8, 1996	Oizumi	T. Kobayashi	·	6.5 km	MPC · JPL
16783 Bychkov	1996 XY_{25}	Bychkov	December 14, 1996	Goodricke-Pigott	R. A. Tucker	EUN	4.3 km	MPC · JPL
16784	1996 YD_{2}	—	December 22, 1996	Xinglong	SCAP	·	10 km	MPC · JPL
16785	1997 AL_{1}	—	January 2, 1997	Oizumi	T. Kobayashi	·	31 km	MPC · JPL
16786	1997 AT_{1}	—	January 2, 1997	Nachi-Katsuura	Y. Shimizu, T. Urata	·	25 km	MPC · JPL
16787	1997 AZ_{1}	—	January 3, 1997	Oizumi	T. Kobayashi	·	6.7 km	MPC · JPL
16788 Alyssarose	1997 AR_{2}	Alyssarose	January 3, 1997	Oizumi	T. Kobayashi	THM	10 km	MPC · JPL
16789	1997 AU_{3}	—	January 3, 1997	Oohira	T. Urata	·	6.6 km	MPC · JPL
16790 Yuuzou	1997 AZ_{4}	Yuuzou	January 2, 1997	Chichibu	N. Satō	·	6.7 km	MPC · JPL
16791	1997 AR_{5}	—	January 7, 1997	Oizumi	T. Kobayashi	·	9.5 km	MPC · JPL
16792	1997 AK_{13}	—	January 11, 1997	Oizumi	T. Kobayashi	·	12 km	MPC · JPL
16793	1997 AA_{18}	—	January 15, 1997	Oizumi	T. Kobayashi	EOS	9.5 km	MPC · JPL
16794 Cucullia	1997 CQ_{1}	Cucullia	February 2, 1997	Kleť	J. Tichá, M. Tichý	LUT	12 km	MPC · JPL
16795	1997 CA_{3}	—	February 3, 1997	Oizumi	T. Kobayashi	·	9.4 km	MPC · JPL
16796 Shinji	1997 CY_{16}	Shinji	February 6, 1997	Chichibu	N. Satō	slow	10 km	MPC · JPL
16797 Wilkerson	1997 CA_{17}	Wilkerson	February 7, 1997	San Marcello	A. Boattini, L. Tesi	·	10 km	MPC · JPL
16798	1997 EL_{50}	—	March 5, 1997	La Silla	E. W. Elst	·	3.4 km	MPC · JPL
16799	1997 JU_{7}	—	May 3, 1997	Xinglong	SCAP	PHO	3.6 km	MPC · JPL
16800	1997 JQ_{16}	—	May 3, 1997	La Silla	E. W. Elst	·	4.1 km	MPC · JPL

== 16801–16900 ==
back to top

Designation			Discovery			Properties		Ref
Permanent	Provisional	Named after	Date	Site	Discoverer(s)	Category	Diam.	Ref
16801 Petřínpragensis	1997 SC_{2}	Petřínpragensis	September 23, 1997	Ondřejov	P. Pravec	·	4.5 km	MPC · JPL
16802 Rainer	1997 SP_{3}	Rainer	September 25, 1997	Davidschlag	E. Meyer	·	2.7 km	MPC · JPL
16803	1997 SU_{10}	—	September 26, 1997	Xinglong	SCAP	·	2.3 km	MPC · JPL
16804 Bonini	1997 SX_{15}	Bonini	September 27, 1997	Caussols	ODAS	·	6.0 km	MPC · JPL
16805	1997 SE_{16}	—	September 27, 1997	Uenohara	N. Kawasato	·	5.8 km	MPC · JPL
16806	1997 SB_{34}	—	September 17, 1997	Xinglong	SCAP	·	3.7 km	MPC · JPL
16807 Terasako	1997 TW_{25}	Terasako	October 12, 1997	Kuma Kogen	A. Nakamura	·	2.4 km	MPC · JPL
16808	1997 TV_{26}	—	October 8, 1997	Uenohara	N. Kawasato	·	3.6 km	MPC · JPL
16809 Galápagos	1997 US	Galápagos	October 21, 1997	Starkenburg Observatory	Starkenburg	·	4.1 km	MPC · JPL
16810 Pavelaleksandrov	1997 UY_{2}	Pavelaleksandrov	October 25, 1997	Prescott	P. G. Comba	·	2.8 km	MPC · JPL
16811	1997 UP_{3}	—	October 26, 1997	Oizumi	T. Kobayashi	·	3.7 km	MPC · JPL
16812	1997 UQ_{3}	—	October 26, 1997	Oizumi	T. Kobayashi	MAS	3.2 km	MPC · JPL
16813 Ronmastaler	1997 UT_{6}	Ronmastaler	October 23, 1997	Kitt Peak	Spacewatch	·	2.9 km	MPC · JPL
16814	1997 UY_{8}	—	October 29, 1997	Oizumi	T. Kobayashi	·	2.6 km	MPC · JPL
16815	1997 UA_{9}	—	October 29, 1997	Oizumi	T. Kobayashi	·	10 km	MPC · JPL
16816	1997 UF_{9}	—	October 29, 1997	Socorro	LINEAR	APO +1km	2.0 km	MPC · JPL
16817 Onderlička	1997 UU_{10}	Onderlička	October 30, 1997	Ondřejov	P. Pravec	·	6.3 km	MPC · JPL
16818	1997 UL_{24}	—	October 28, 1997	Xinglong	SCAP	MAR	8.2 km	MPC · JPL
16819	1997 VW	—	November 1, 1997	Oizumi	T. Kobayashi	EUN · slow	8.0 km	MPC · JPL
16820	1997 VA_{3}	—	November 6, 1997	Zeno	T. Stafford	·	4.1 km	MPC · JPL
16821	1997 VZ_{4}	—	November 5, 1997	Nachi-Katsuura	Y. Shimizu, T. Urata	(2076)	4.8 km	MPC · JPL
16822	1997 VA_{5}	—	November 5, 1997	Nachi-Katsuura	Y. Shimizu, T. Urata	·	2.6 km	MPC · JPL
16823	1997 VE_{6}	—	November 9, 1997	Oizumi	T. Kobayashi	·	2.3 km	MPC · JPL
16824	1997 VA_{8}	—	November 6, 1997	Xinglong	SCAP	·	4.5 km	MPC · JPL
16825	1997 VC_{8}	—	November 6, 1997	Xinglong	SCAP	·	3.0 km	MPC · JPL
16826 Daisuke	1997 WA_{2}	Daisuke	November 19, 1997	Chichibu	N. Satō	·	3.0 km	MPC · JPL
16827	1997 WD_{2}	—	November 23, 1997	Oizumi	T. Kobayashi	·	4.9 km	MPC · JPL
16828	1997 WR_{2}	—	November 23, 1997	Oizumi	T. Kobayashi	·	2.6 km	MPC · JPL
16829 Richardfrench	1997 WG_{7}	Richardfrench	November 24, 1997	Kitt Peak	Spacewatch	fast	4.8 km	MPC · JPL
16830	1997 WQ_{7}	—	November 19, 1997	Nachi-Katsuura	Y. Shimizu, T. Urata	·	2.7 km	MPC · JPL
16831	1997 WM_{21}	—	November 30, 1997	Oizumi	T. Kobayashi	·	4.3 km	MPC · JPL
16832	1997 WR_{21}	—	November 30, 1997	Oizumi	T. Kobayashi	(2076)	3.4 km	MPC · JPL
16833	1997 WX_{21}	—	November 19, 1997	Xinglong	SCAP	EUN	7.0 km	MPC · JPL
16834	1997 WU_{22}	—	November 30, 1997	Haleakala	NEAT	APO +1km	1.9 km	MPC · JPL
16835	1997 WT_{34}	—	November 29, 1997	Socorro	LINEAR	·	4.9 km	MPC · JPL
16836	1997 WG_{36}	—	November 29, 1997	Socorro	LINEAR	NYS	3.2 km	MPC · JPL
16837	1997 WM_{39}	—	November 29, 1997	Socorro	LINEAR	·	2.0 km	MPC · JPL
16838	1997 WT_{39}	—	November 29, 1997	Socorro	LINEAR	·	9.5 km	MPC · JPL
16839	1997 WT_{41}	—	November 29, 1997	Socorro	LINEAR	KOR	6.0 km	MPC · JPL
16840	1997 WT_{44}	—	November 29, 1997	Socorro	LINEAR	·	6.8 km	MPC · JPL
16841	1997 WY_{49}	—	November 26, 1997	Socorro	LINEAR	·	2.7 km	MPC · JPL
16842	1997 XS_{3}	—	December 3, 1997	Caussols	ODAS	·	6.3 km	MPC · JPL
16843	1997 XX_{3}	—	December 4, 1997	Caussols	ODAS	3:2 · slow	17 km	MPC · JPL
16844	1997 XY_{3}	—	December 4, 1997	Caussols	ODAS	HOF	11 km	MPC · JPL
16845	1997 XA_{9}	—	December 7, 1997	Caussols	ODAS	KOR	5.7 km	MPC · JPL
16846	1997 XA_{10}	—	December 5, 1997	Oizumi	T. Kobayashi	MIS	9.0 km	MPC · JPL
16847 Sanpoloamosciano	1997 XK_{10}	Sanpoloamosciano	December 8, 1997	San Polo a Mosciano	Mannucci, M., Montigiani, N.	·	8.6 km	MPC · JPL
16848	1997 XN_{12}	—	December 4, 1997	Socorro	LINEAR	·	2.1 km	MPC · JPL
16849	1997 YV	—	December 20, 1997	Oizumi	T. Kobayashi	NYS	3.2 km	MPC · JPL
16850	1997 YS_{1}	—	December 20, 1997	Xinglong	SCAP	V	3.5 km	MPC · JPL
16851	1997 YU_{1}	—	December 21, 1997	Xinglong	SCAP	slow	1.8 km	MPC · JPL
16852 Nuredduna	1997 YP_{2}	Nuredduna	December 21, 1997	Majorca	Á. López J., R. Pacheco	·	3.7 km	MPC · JPL
16853 Masafumi	1997 YV_{2}	Masafumi	December 21, 1997	Chichibu	N. Satō	THM	12 km	MPC · JPL
16854	1997 YL_{3}	—	December 20, 1997	Xinglong	SCAP	·	4.1 km	MPC · JPL
16855	1997 YN_{7}	—	December 27, 1997	Oizumi	T. Kobayashi	MAR	5.1 km	MPC · JPL
16856 Banach	1997 YE_{8}	Banach	December 28, 1997	Prescott	P. G. Comba	·	2.9 km	MPC · JPL
16857 Goodall	1997 YZ_{8}	Goodall	December 25, 1997	Haleakala	NEAT	·	2.7 km	MPC · JPL
16858	1997 YG_{10}	—	December 28, 1997	Oizumi	T. Kobayashi	(5)	4.3 km	MPC · JPL
16859	1997 YJ_{10}	—	December 28, 1997	Oizumi	T. Kobayashi	·	5.3 km	MPC · JPL
16860	1997 YT_{10}	—	December 22, 1997	Xinglong	SCAP	·	10 km	MPC · JPL
16861 Lipovetsky	1997 YZ_{11}	Lipovetsky	December 27, 1997	Goodricke-Pigott	R. A. Tucker	·	4.1 km	MPC · JPL
16862	1997 YM_{14}	—	December 31, 1997	Oizumi	T. Kobayashi	·	3.2 km	MPC · JPL
16863	1997 YJ_{16}	—	December 31, 1997	Nachi-Katsuura	Y. Shimizu, T. Urata	·	8.0 km	MPC · JPL
16864	1998 AL	—	January 5, 1998	Oizumi	T. Kobayashi	·	4.9 km	MPC · JPL
16865	1998 AQ	—	January 5, 1998	Oizumi	T. Kobayashi	·	9.9 km	MPC · JPL
16866	1998 AR	—	January 5, 1998	Oizumi	T. Kobayashi	·	7.6 km	MPC · JPL
16867	1998 AX	—	January 5, 1998	Oizumi	T. Kobayashi	V	4.8 km	MPC · JPL
16868	1998 AK_{8}	—	January 9, 1998	Caussols	ODAS	·	1.1 km	MPC · JPL
16869 Košinár	1998 AV_{8}	Košinár	January 10, 1998	Modra	A. Galád, Pravda, A.	·	3.4 km	MPC · JPL
16870	1998 BB	—	January 16, 1998	Oizumi	T. Kobayashi	·	2.9 km	MPC · JPL
16871	1998 BD	—	January 16, 1998	Oizumi	T. Kobayashi	·	3.1 km	MPC · JPL
16872	1998 BZ	—	January 19, 1998	Oizumi	T. Kobayashi	·	3.8 km	MPC · JPL
16873	1998 BO_{1}	—	January 19, 1998	Oizumi	T. Kobayashi	·	3.5 km	MPC · JPL
16874 Kurtwahl	1998 BK_{2}	Kurtwahl	January 20, 1998	Socorro	LINEAR	·	2.5 km	MPC · JPL
16875	1998 BD_{4}	—	January 20, 1998	Nachi-Katsuura	Y. Shimizu, T. Urata	EUN	3.6 km	MPC · JPL
16876	1998 BV_{6}	—	January 24, 1998	Oizumi	T. Kobayashi	VER	11 km	MPC · JPL
16877	1998 BW_{6}	—	January 24, 1998	Oizumi	T. Kobayashi	·	9.2 km	MPC · JPL
16878 Tombickler	1998 BL_{9}	Tombickler	January 24, 1998	Haleakala	NEAT	ADE	15 km	MPC · JPL
16879 Campai	1998 BH_{10}	Campai	January 24, 1998	San Marcello	A. Boattini, M. Tombelli	slow	10 km	MPC · JPL
16880	1998 BW_{11}	—	January 23, 1998	Socorro	LINEAR	NYS	3.9 km	MPC · JPL
16881 Angelinmathew	1998 BH_{12}	Angelinmathew	January 23, 1998	Socorro	LINEAR	MAR	3.5 km	MPC · JPL
16882	1998 BO_{13}	—	January 24, 1998	Socorro	LINEAR	(11097) · CYB · 2:1J	9.8 km	MPC · JPL
16883 Adeenedenton	1998 BA_{20}	Adeenedenton	January 22, 1998	Kitt Peak	Spacewatch	·	7.8 km	MPC · JPL
16884	1998 BL_{25}	—	January 28, 1998	Oizumi	T. Kobayashi	AGN	4.7 km	MPC · JPL
16885	1998 BX_{25}	—	January 25, 1998	Nachi-Katsuura	Y. Shimizu, T. Urata	·	16 km	MPC · JPL
16886	1998 BC_{26}	—	January 29, 1998	Oizumi	T. Kobayashi	·	6.1 km	MPC · JPL
16887 Blouke	1998 BE_{26}	Blouke	January 28, 1998	Caussols	ODAS	EOS	5.4 km	MPC · JPL
16888 Michaelbarber	1998 BM_{26}	Michaelbarber	January 29, 1998	Farra d'Isonzo	Farra d'Isonzo	EUN	4.2 km	MPC · JPL
16889	1998 BD_{27}	—	January 22, 1998	Kitt Peak	Spacewatch	·	6.6 km	MPC · JPL
16890	1998 BJ_{33}	—	January 29, 1998	Uenohara	N. Kawasato	MAR	4.2 km	MPC · JPL
16891	1998 BQ_{45}	—	January 24, 1998	Haleakala	NEAT	·	9.1 km	MPC · JPL
16892 Vaissière	1998 DN_{1}	Vaissière	February 17, 1998	Bédoin	P. Antonini	THM	11 km	MPC · JPL
16893	1998 DS_{3}	—	February 22, 1998	Haleakala	NEAT	EOS	10 km	MPC · JPL
16894	1998 DP_{9}	—	February 22, 1998	Haleakala	NEAT	EOS	8.7 km	MPC · JPL
16895	1998 DQ_{9}	—	February 22, 1998	Haleakala	NEAT	EOS	10 km	MPC · JPL
16896	1998 DS_{9}	—	February 20, 1998	Xinglong	SCAP	PHO · slow	5.6 km	MPC · JPL
16897	1998 DH_{10}	—	February 22, 1998	Haleakala	NEAT	EMA	14 km	MPC · JPL
16898	1998 DJ_{10}	—	February 22, 1998	Haleakala	NEAT	·	5.7 km	MPC · JPL
16899	1998 DK_{10}	—	February 22, 1998	Haleakala	NEAT	GEF	5.0 km	MPC · JPL
16900 Lozère	1998 DQ_{13}	Lozère	February 27, 1998	Pises	B. Gaillard, J.-M. Lopez	·	10 km	MPC · JPL

== 16901–17000 ==
back to top

Designation			Discovery			Properties		Ref
Permanent	Provisional	Named after	Date	Site	Discoverer(s)	Category	Diam.	Ref
16901 Johnbrooks	1998 DJ_{14}	Johnbrooks	February 23, 1998	Farra d'Isonzo	Farra d'Isonzo	MAR	3.4 km	MPC · JPL
16902	1998 DT_{14}	—	February 22, 1998	Haleakala	NEAT	·	4.3 km	MPC · JPL
16903	1998 DD_{15}	—	February 22, 1998	Haleakala	NEAT	·	7.8 km	MPC · JPL
16904	1998 DQ_{15}	—	February 22, 1998	Haleakala	NEAT	·	9.3 km	MPC · JPL
16905	1998 DT_{21}	—	February 22, 1998	Kitt Peak	Spacewatch	·	9.7 km	MPC · JPL
16906 Giovannisilva	1998 DY_{23}	Giovannisilva	February 18, 1998	Bologna	San Vittore	EOS	4.0 km	MPC · JPL
16907	1998 DS_{29}	—	February 28, 1998	Kitt Peak	Spacewatch	EOS	9.9 km	MPC · JPL
16908 Groeselenberg	1998 DD_{33}	Groeselenberg	February 17, 1998	Uccle	E. W. Elst, T. Pauwels	·	5.8 km	MPC · JPL
16909 Miladejager	1998 DX_{33}	Miladejager	February 27, 1998	La Silla	E. W. Elst	KOR	6.9 km	MPC · JPL
16910	1998 DE_{34}	—	February 27, 1998	La Silla	E. W. Elst	·	11 km	MPC · JPL
16911	1998 EL_{6}	—	March 1, 1998	Caussols	ODAS	EOS	5.5 km	MPC · JPL
16912 Rhiannon	1998 EP_{8}	Rhiannon	March 2, 1998	Caussols	ODAS	AMO +1km	930 m	MPC · JPL
16913	1998 EK_{9}	—	March 11, 1998	Xinglong	SCAP	PHO	12 km	MPC · JPL
16914	1998 ER_{13}	—	March 1, 1998	La Silla	E. W. Elst	EOS	7.1 km	MPC · JPL
16915 Bredthauer	1998 FR_{10}	Bredthauer	March 24, 1998	Caussols	ODAS	HIL · 3:2	14 km	MPC · JPL
16916	1998 FM_{15}	—	March 27, 1998	Woomera	F. B. Zoltowski	·	9.5 km	MPC · JPL
16917	1998 FB_{29}	—	March 20, 1998	Socorro	LINEAR	KOR · slow	6.7 km	MPC · JPL
16918	1998 FF_{32}	—	March 20, 1998	Socorro	LINEAR	CYB	9.9 km	MPC · JPL
16919	1998 FF_{35}	—	March 20, 1998	Socorro	LINEAR	·	9.9 km	MPC · JPL
16920 Larrywalker	1998 FR_{37}	Larrywalker	March 20, 1998	Socorro	LINEAR	PAD	6.7 km	MPC · JPL
16921	1998 FZ_{52}	—	March 20, 1998	Socorro	LINEAR	·	14 km	MPC · JPL
16922	1998 FR_{57}	—	March 20, 1998	Socorro	LINEAR	HYG	14 km	MPC · JPL
16923	1998 FB_{61}	—	March 20, 1998	Socorro	LINEAR	THM	11 km	MPC · JPL
16924	1998 FL_{61}	—	March 20, 1998	Socorro	LINEAR	EOS	12 km	MPC · JPL
16925	1998 FB_{63}	—	March 20, 1998	Socorro	LINEAR	·	4.6 km	MPC · JPL
16926	1998 FH_{63}	—	March 20, 1998	Socorro	LINEAR	KOR	5.9 km	MPC · JPL
16927	1998 FX_{68}	—	March 20, 1998	Socorro	LINEAR	3:2	23 km	MPC · JPL
16928	1998 FF_{70}	—	March 20, 1998	Socorro	LINEAR	·	13 km	MPC · JPL
16929 Hurník	1998 FP_{73}	Hurník	March 31, 1998	Ondřejov	P. Pravec	·	9.5 km	MPC · JPL
16930 Respighi	1998 FF_{74}	Respighi	March 29, 1998	Bologna	San Vittore	·	11 km	MPC · JPL
16931	1998 FO_{75}	—	March 24, 1998	Socorro	LINEAR	(5651) · slow	11 km	MPC · JPL
16932	1998 FG_{88}	—	March 24, 1998	Socorro	LINEAR	·	5.9 km	MPC · JPL
16933	1998 FV_{88}	—	March 24, 1998	Socorro	LINEAR	EOS	7.5 km	MPC · JPL
16934 Kevinmeng	1998 FA_{91}	Kevinmeng	March 24, 1998	Socorro	LINEAR	·	6.3 km	MPC · JPL
16935	1998 FX_{111}	—	March 31, 1998	Socorro	LINEAR	EOS	10 km	MPC · JPL
16936	1998 FJ_{112}	—	March 31, 1998	Socorro	LINEAR	EOS	10 km	MPC · JPL
16937	1998 FR_{117}	—	March 31, 1998	Socorro	LINEAR	EOS	9.7 km	MPC · JPL
16938 Nalanimiller	1998 FN_{121}	Nalanimiller	March 20, 1998	Socorro	LINEAR	GEF	5.3 km	MPC · JPL
16939 Rishabhmisra	1998 FP_{121}	Rishabhmisra	March 20, 1998	Socorro	LINEAR	·	9.0 km	MPC · JPL
16940	1998 GC_{3}	—	April 2, 1998	Socorro	LINEAR	EUN	5.7 km	MPC · JPL
16941	1998 GR_{7}	—	April 2, 1998	Socorro	LINEAR	·	19 km	MPC · JPL
16942	1998 HA_{34}	—	April 20, 1998	Socorro	LINEAR	slow	18 km	MPC · JPL
16943	1998 HP_{42}	—	April 23, 1998	Haleakala	NEAT	EUN	8.1 km	MPC · JPL
16944 Wangler	1998 HK_{45}	Wangler	April 20, 1998	Socorro	LINEAR	·	6.8 km	MPC · JPL
16945	1998 HD_{46}	—	April 20, 1998	Socorro	LINEAR	THM	12 km	MPC · JPL
16946 Farnham	1998 HJ_{51}	Farnham	April 25, 1998	Anderson Mesa	LONEOS	V	3.4 km	MPC · JPL
16947 Wikrent	1998 HN_{80}	Wikrent	April 21, 1998	Socorro	LINEAR	·	2.5 km	MPC · JPL
16948	1998 HA_{133}	—	April 19, 1998	Socorro	LINEAR	·	13 km	MPC · JPL
16949	1998 HS_{133}	—	April 19, 1998	Socorro	LINEAR	EOS	6.5 km	MPC · JPL
16950	1998 JQ	—	May 1, 1998	Haleakala	NEAT	·	4.8 km	MPC · JPL
16951 Carolus Quartus	1998 KJ	Carolus Quartus	May 19, 1998	Ondřejov	P. Pravec	EOS	9.6 km	MPC · JPL
16952 Peteschultz	1998 KX_{3}	Peteschultz	May 22, 1998	Anderson Mesa	LONEOS	·	9.0 km	MPC · JPL
16953 Besicovitch	1998 KE_{5}	Besicovitch	May 27, 1998	Prescott	P. G. Comba	·	17 km	MPC · JPL
16954 Annikamorgan	1998 KT_{48}	Annikamorgan	May 22, 1998	Socorro	LINEAR	EUN	5.3 km	MPC · JPL
16955	1998 KU_{48}	—	May 23, 1998	Socorro	LINEAR	PHO	12 km	MPC · JPL
16956	1998 MQ_{11}	—	June 19, 1998	Socorro	LINEAR	L5	39 km	MPC · JPL
16957	1998 ON_{13}	—	July 26, 1998	La Silla	E. W. Elst	·	4.1 km	MPC · JPL
16958 Klaasen	1998 PF	Klaasen	August 2, 1998	Anderson Mesa	LONEOS	·	4.9 km	MPC · JPL
16959	1998 QE_{17}	—	August 17, 1998	Socorro	LINEAR	·	9.1 km	MPC · JPL
16960	1998 QS_{52}	—	August 25, 1998	Socorro	LINEAR	APO +1km · PHA	4.9 km	MPC · JPL
16961 Mullahy	1998 QV_{73}	Mullahy	August 24, 1998	Socorro	LINEAR	·	5.8 km	MPC · JPL
16962 Elizawoolard	1998 QP_{93}	Elizawoolard	August 28, 1998	Socorro	LINEAR	V	3.3 km	MPC · JPL
16963	1998 RE_{2}	—	September 12, 1998	Woomera	F. B. Zoltowski	EOS	8.6 km	MPC · JPL
16964	1998 RD_{59}	—	September 14, 1998	Socorro	LINEAR	·	9.8 km	MPC · JPL
16965	1998 RX_{79}	—	September 14, 1998	Socorro	LINEAR	·	5.4 km	MPC · JPL
16966	1998 SM_{63}	—	September 29, 1998	Xinglong	SCAP	·	3.6 km	MPC · JPL
16967 Marcosbosso	1998 SR_{132}	Marcosbosso	September 26, 1998	Socorro	LINEAR	·	3.3 km	MPC · JPL
16968	1998 TT_{5}	—	October 13, 1998	Višnjan Observatory	K. Korlević	·	15 km	MPC · JPL
16969 Helamuda	1998 UM_{20}	Helamuda	October 29, 1998	Starkenburg Observatory	Starkenburg	THM	7.9 km	MPC · JPL
16970	1998 VV_{2}	—	November 10, 1998	Caussols	ODAS	3:2	25 km	MPC · JPL
16971	1998 WJ_{3}	—	November 19, 1998	Oizumi	T. Kobayashi	EUN	7.7 km	MPC · JPL
16972 Neish	1998 WK_{11}	Neish	November 21, 1998	Socorro	LINEAR	·	5.5 km	MPC · JPL
16973 Gaspari	1998 WR_{19}	Gaspari	November 23, 1998	Socorro	LINEAR	·	3.9 km	MPC · JPL
16974 Iphthime	1998 WR_{21}	Iphthime	November 18, 1998	Socorro	LINEAR	L4 · moon	57 km	MPC · JPL
16975 Delamere	1998 YX_{29}	Delamere	December 27, 1998	Anderson Mesa	LONEOS	·	7.5 km	MPC · JPL
16976	1999 AC_{2}	—	January 6, 1999	Višnjan Observatory	K. Korlević	NYS	4.1 km	MPC · JPL
16977	1999 AS_{3}	—	January 10, 1999	Oizumi	T. Kobayashi	·	4.1 km	MPC · JPL
16978	1999 AN_{4}	—	January 11, 1999	Oizumi	T. Kobayashi	PHO	3.8 km	MPC · JPL
16979	1999 AO_{4}	—	January 11, 1999	Oizumi	T. Kobayashi	·	8.2 km	MPC · JPL
16980	1999 AP_{5}	—	January 12, 1999	Oizumi	T. Kobayashi	·	3.5 km	MPC · JPL
16981	1999 AU_{7}	—	January 11, 1999	Gekko	T. Kagawa	·	3.3 km	MPC · JPL
16982 Tsinghua	1999 AS_{9}	Tsinghua	January 10, 1999	Xinglong	SCAP	·	3.2 km	MPC · JPL
16983	1999 AQ_{21}	—	January 14, 1999	Višnjan Observatory	K. Korlević	MAS	2.8 km	MPC · JPL
16984 Veillet	1999 AA_{25}	Veillet	January 15, 1999	Caussols	ODAS	·	2.3 km	MPC · JPL
16985	1999 AE_{28}	—	January 11, 1999	Kitt Peak	Spacewatch	·	3.3 km	MPC · JPL
16986 Archivestef	1999 AR_{34}	Archivestef	January 15, 1999	Anderson Mesa	LONEOS	·	3.8 km	MPC · JPL
16987	1999 BN_{13}	—	January 25, 1999	Višnjan Observatory	K. Korlević	·	3.0 km	MPC · JPL
16988	1999 BK_{14}	—	January 23, 1999	Caussols	ODAS	·	9.7 km	MPC · JPL
16989	1999 CX	—	February 5, 1999	Oizumi	T. Kobayashi	·	3.3 km	MPC · JPL
16990	1999 CS_{1}	—	February 7, 1999	Oizumi	T. Kobayashi	BAP	3.6 km	MPC · JPL
16991	1999 CW_{4}	—	February 12, 1999	Višnjan Observatory	K. Korlević	·	2.8 km	MPC · JPL
16992	1999 CU_{5}	—	February 12, 1999	Oizumi	T. Kobayashi	·	5.3 km	MPC · JPL
16993	1999 CC_{10}	—	February 15, 1999	High Point	D. K. Chesney	·	5.0 km	MPC · JPL
16994	1999 CJ_{14}	—	February 13, 1999	Višnjan Observatory	K. Korlević	·	8.2 km	MPC · JPL
16995	1999 CX_{14}	—	February 15, 1999	Višnjan Observatory	K. Korlević	·	4.2 km	MPC · JPL
16996 Dahir	1999 CM_{32}	Dahir	February 10, 1999	Socorro	LINEAR	·	3.4 km	MPC · JPL
16997 Garrone	1999 CO_{32}	Garrone	February 10, 1999	Socorro	LINEAR	·	3.6 km	MPC · JPL
16998 Estelleweber	1999 CG_{46}	Estelleweber	February 10, 1999	Socorro	LINEAR	·	3.5 km	MPC · JPL
16999 Ajstewart	1999 CE_{47}	Ajstewart	February 10, 1999	Socorro	LINEAR	·	4.8 km	MPC · JPL
17000 Medvedev	1999 CV_{48}	Medvedev	February 10, 1999	Socorro	LINEAR	·	3.8 km	MPC · JPL

back to top

== See also ==
- Meanings of minor-planet names: 16001–17000
