= Ōizumi Observatory =

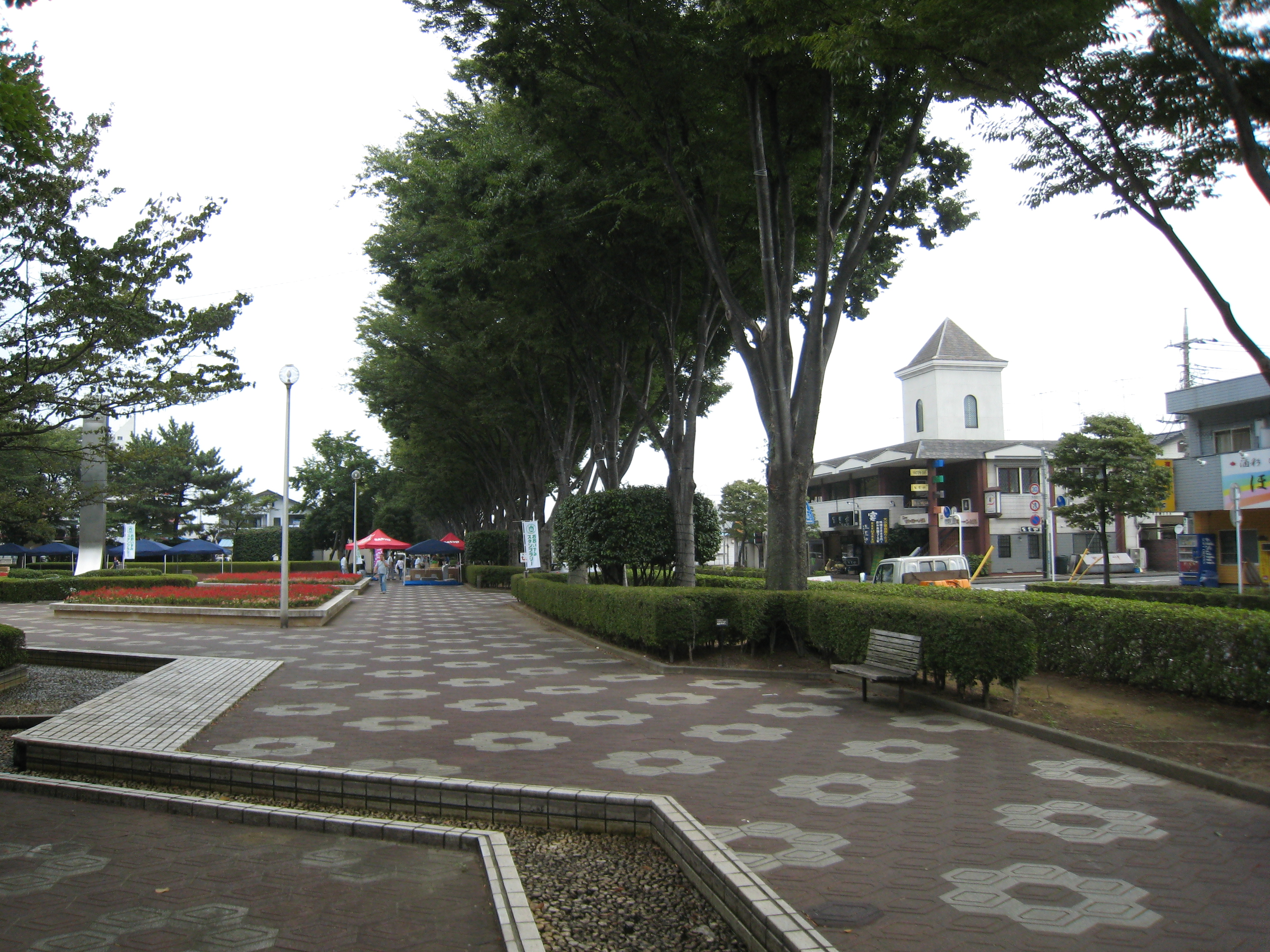
- Organization: Private
- Observatory code: 411
- Location: Ōizumi, Gunma Prefecture, Japan
- Coordinates: 36.2505°N 139.4170°E
- Altitude: 38.179 km (23.723 mi)
- Established: 1990

Ōizumi Observatory (obs. code: 411) is a private astronomical observatory in Ōizumi, Gunma Prefecture, Japan. Takao Kobayashi has made discoveries of numerous minor planets at the observatory. Since its founding, Kobayashi has discovered 1,200 minor asteroids and their positions using a 10-inch (250 mm) telescope. Ōizumi observatory like many other observatories is in a relatively undisturbed place. One of the notable people to work at the observatory is Takao Kobayashi.
