= Port de Pollença =

Town in Mallorca, Spain

Coordinates: 39°54′27″N 3°04′53″E

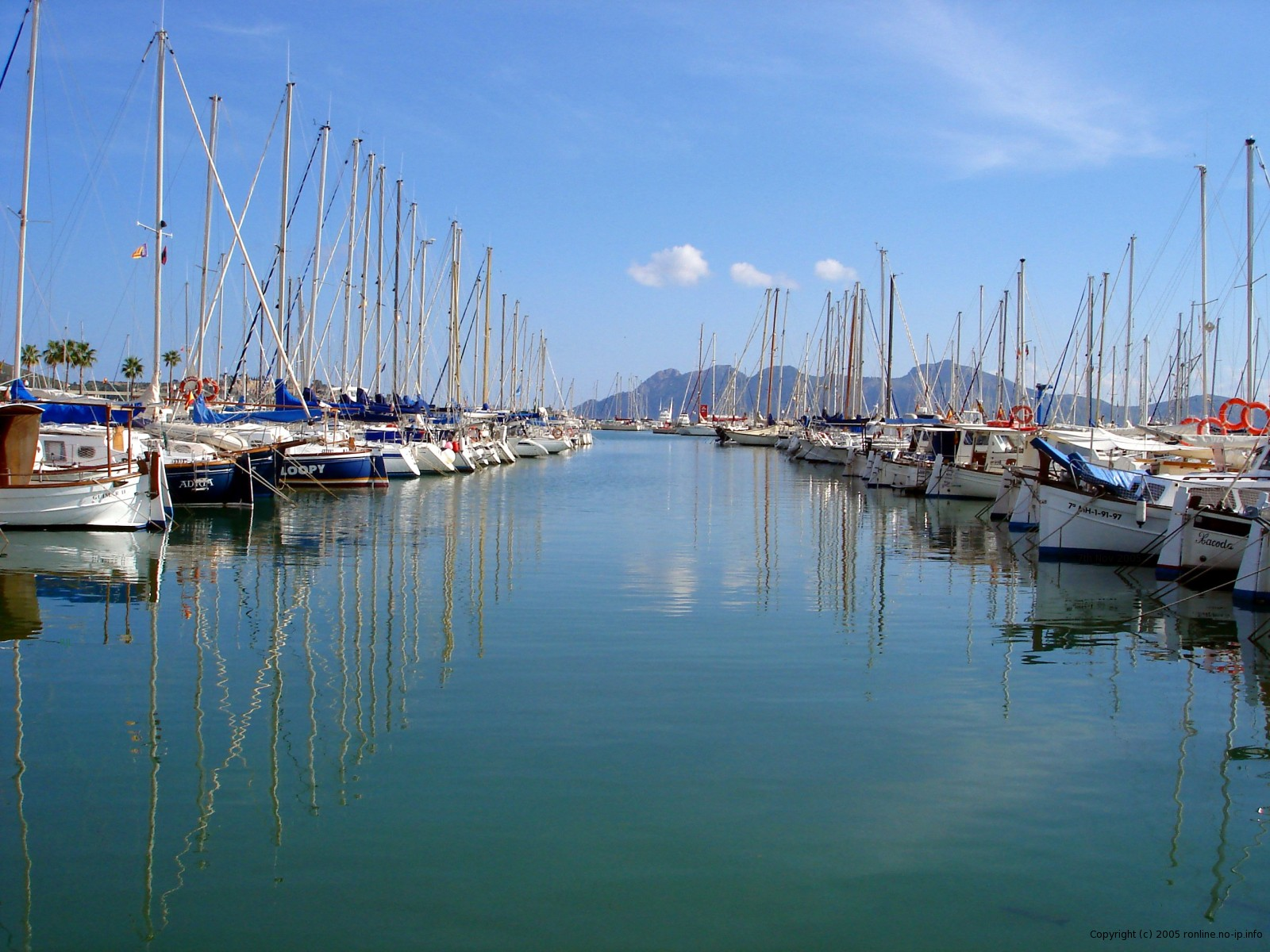
Marina at Port de Pollença

Port de Pollença (Balearic Catalan pronunciation: [ˈpɔɾd də poˈʎɛnsə]; Spanish: Puerto de Pollensa) is a small town in northern Mallorca, Spain, on the Bay of Pollença about 6 km east of Pollença and two kilometres southeast of Cala Sant Vicenç. Cap de Formentor is connected to Port de Pollença via a 13.5 km road.

== Geography ==
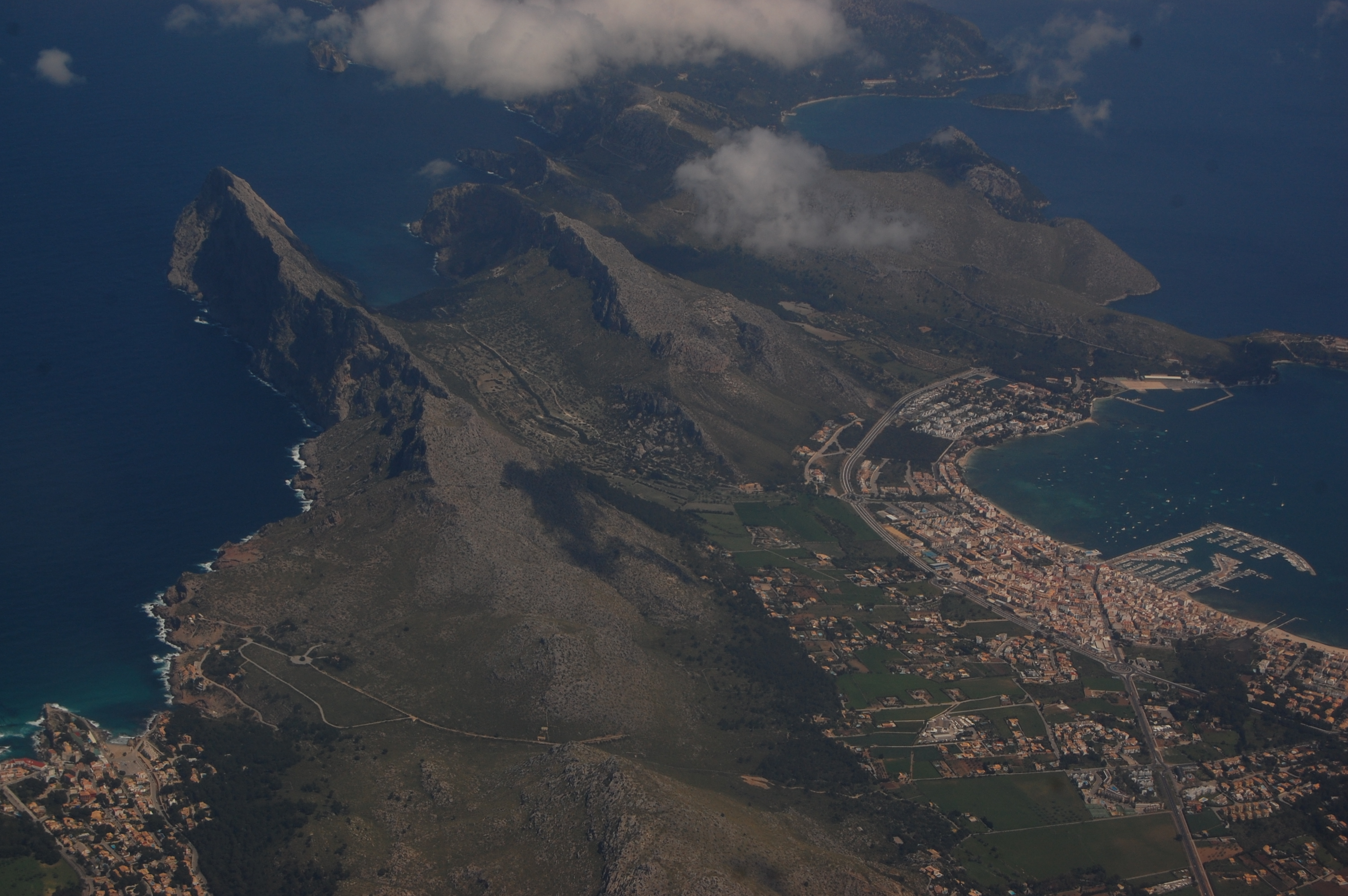
Boquer Valley (left) and Port de Pollença, from the air

Port de Pollença is the most northerly town in Mallorca. It is split into several main areas: Pine walk, Boquer, Central, Siller, Pinaret, Llenaire and Gotmar. The scenic Boquer Valley runs north-east from the town, near the ruins of the pre-Roman city of Bocchoris, one of the oldest settlements on the island.

=== The Pine walk ===
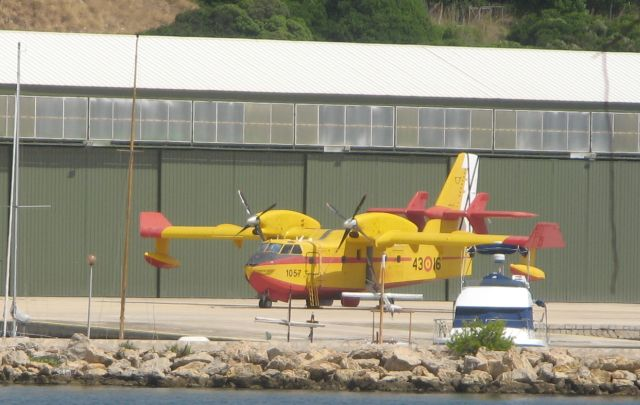
Canadair CL-415 at Military Base, Port de Pollença

The Pine Walk fronts onto a sheltered part of the larger Badia de Pollença. It is the most popular walk around the coastal line of the town and features a bronze bust of the artist Hermenegildo Anglada Camarasa. Near the end of the Pine Walk stands the old Military Base, home of a number of fire fighting aircraft.

==== Military ====
During the Spanish Civil War, the base was supporting Seefliegerstaffel aircraft from the German Condor Legion, for instance, a number of Heinkel He 59. Nowadays, a number of amphibious fire fighting aircraft, typically Canadair CL-415, are kept at the air base to the north of the town and can often be seen on exercise around the bay. The air base is also used as a holiday destination for military personnel from member states of NATO.

=== Central ===
The main square Plaça Miguel Capllonch, named and featuring a bronze bust of pianist and composer Miquel Capllonch Rotger, is surrounded by restaurants, shops and bars, with the Church of Our Lady of Carmen lying to the west. A weekly market, held on Wednesdays, sees the square filled with traders selling fruit, fish, clothing and crafts.

=== Southern ===
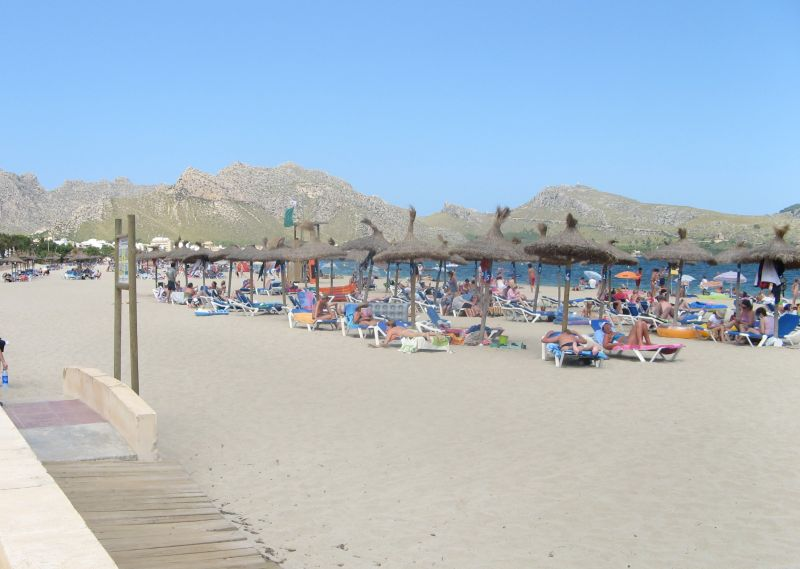
Platja Llenaire 2008

To the south, there is a large, older urbanisation, consisting of three areas: Urban El Pinaret, Urban Gotmar and Urban Llenaire. The area is made up mainly of flats, small hotels and private homes, and has slowly developed over the years. The beach around the area is family friendly, with a gentle grade into the sea, water sports and a wide promenade suitable for walking and cycling.

=== Highways ===
A bypass links the main road into the town PM-220 Carretera Pollença north to the PM-221 following a scenic route along the Cap de Formentor.

== Culture ==
Many artists and celebrities have made Port de Pollença their home, or made short trips to the bay during their life. Famous painters such as the Argentinian Atilio Boveri and Hermenegildo Anglada Camarasa lived in Port de Pollença and popularized the place. A number of Atilio Boveri's paintings can be seen at the Museum of Pollença.

Famous writers such as Rubén Darío visited the place in the early 1900s and wrote a number of poems while on the island. The poet Miquel Costa i Llobera wrote several of his poems about landscapes or history of Pollença and Formentor. Recently, the Peruvian writer Mario Vargas Llosa (winner of the 2010 Nobel Prize in Literature) stayed at the Hotel Formentor. Hotel Formentor is also the backdrop to Màxim Huerta's 2018 novel, "Firmamento".

Agatha Christie visited the town in the early 20th century and stayed at a hotel in the Pine Walk area, which she describes in her book Problem at Pollensa Bay and Other Stories:

"... a small hotel standing on the edge of the sea looking out over a view that in the misty haze of a fine morning had the exquisite vagueness of a Japanese print."

Argentine singer-songwriter and actress Marilina Ross wrote a song titled "Puerto Pollensa" that was popularized by Sandra Mihanovich in 1982. It tells a love story that Ross lived in the beaches of Port de Pollença and is considered a quintessential gay anthem in Argentina.

== Beaches ==
Port de Pollença is home to a beautiful beach in this village, but around the area, there are numerous coves and beaches. The most popular include:

- Cala Figuera
- Cala Murta
- Cala Formentor
- Cala Sant Vicenç
- Cala Boquer
- Llenaire Beach
- Can Cuarassa Beach

== Gallery ==
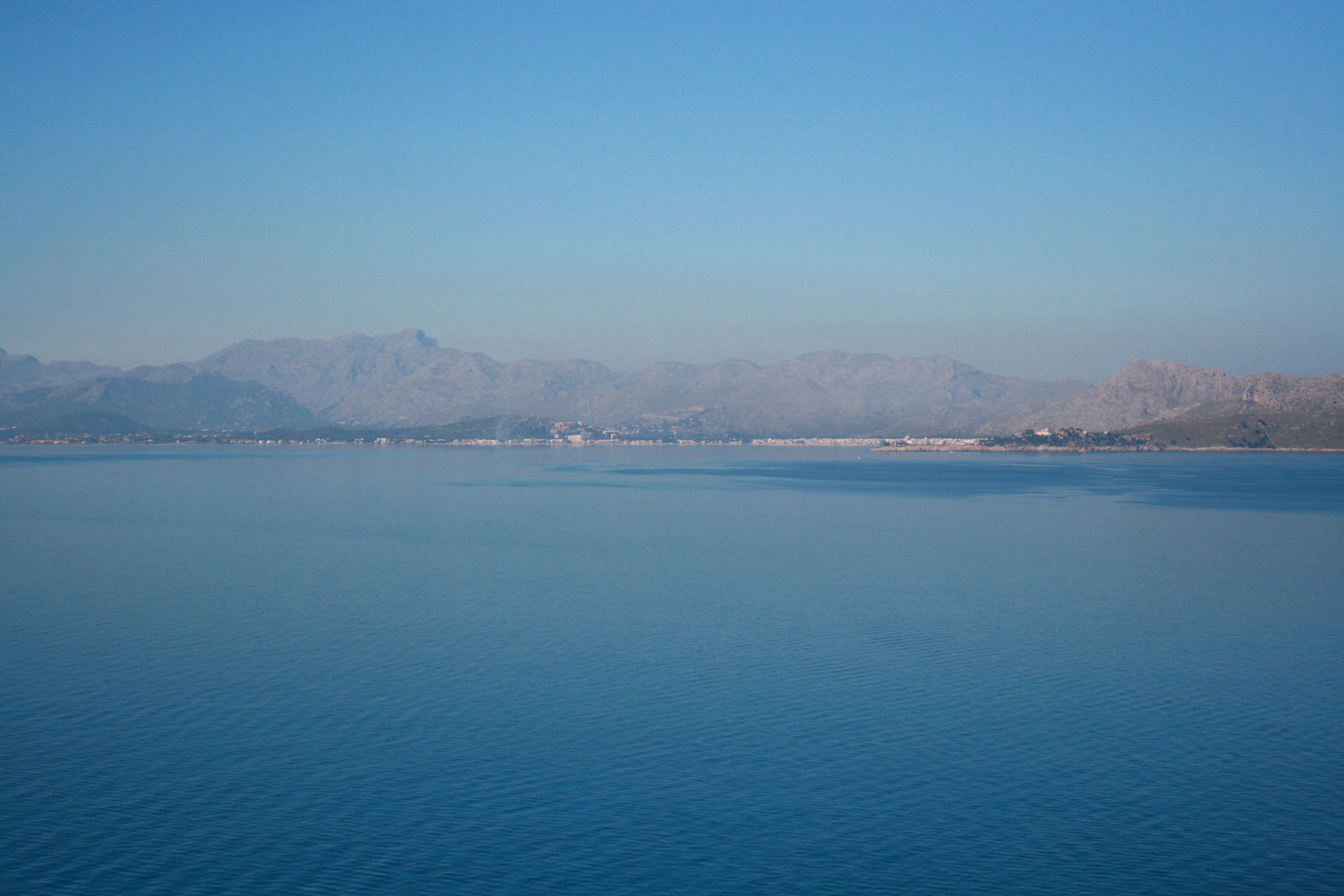
Pollença Bay

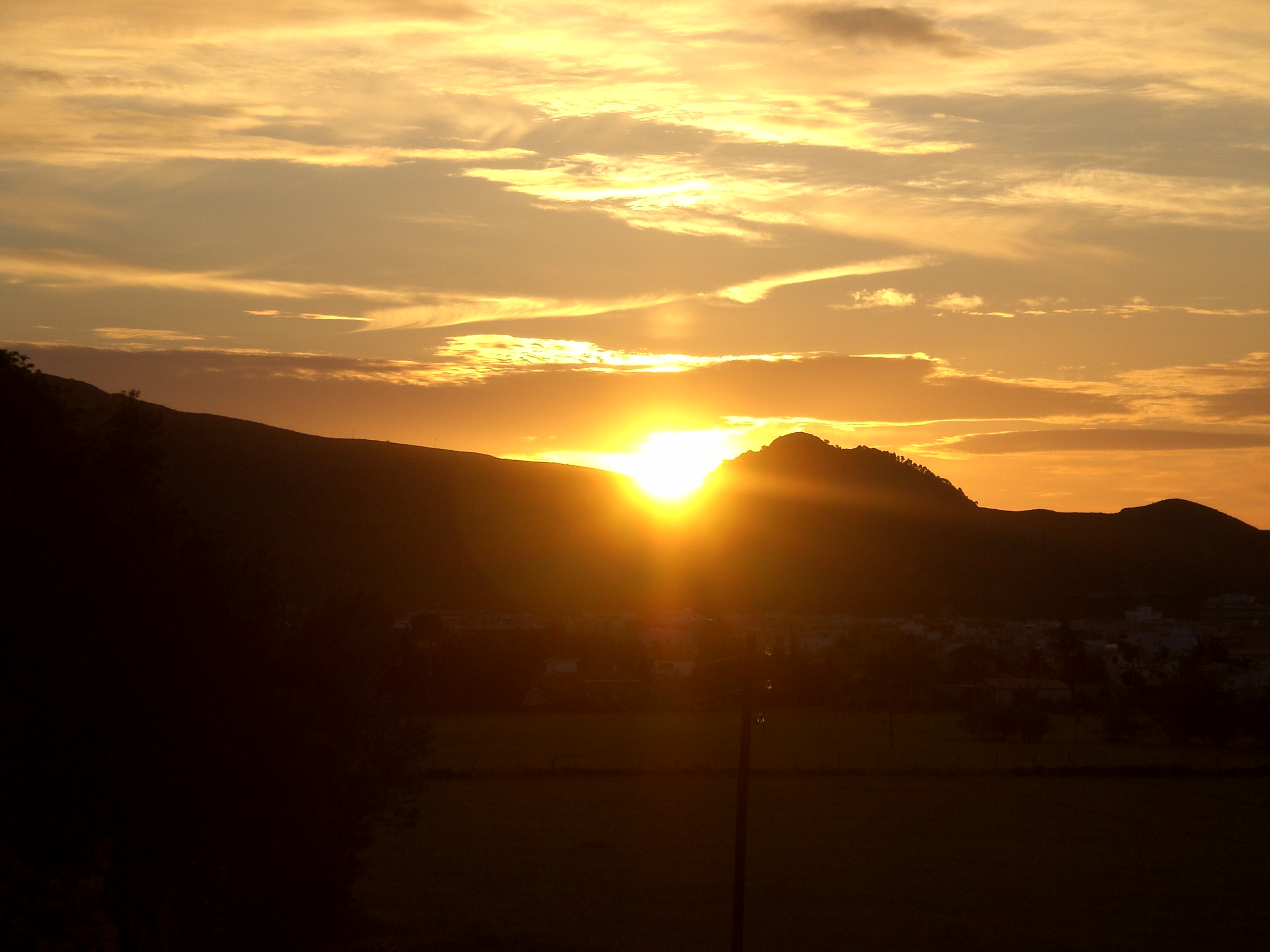
Sunrise across Port de Pollença

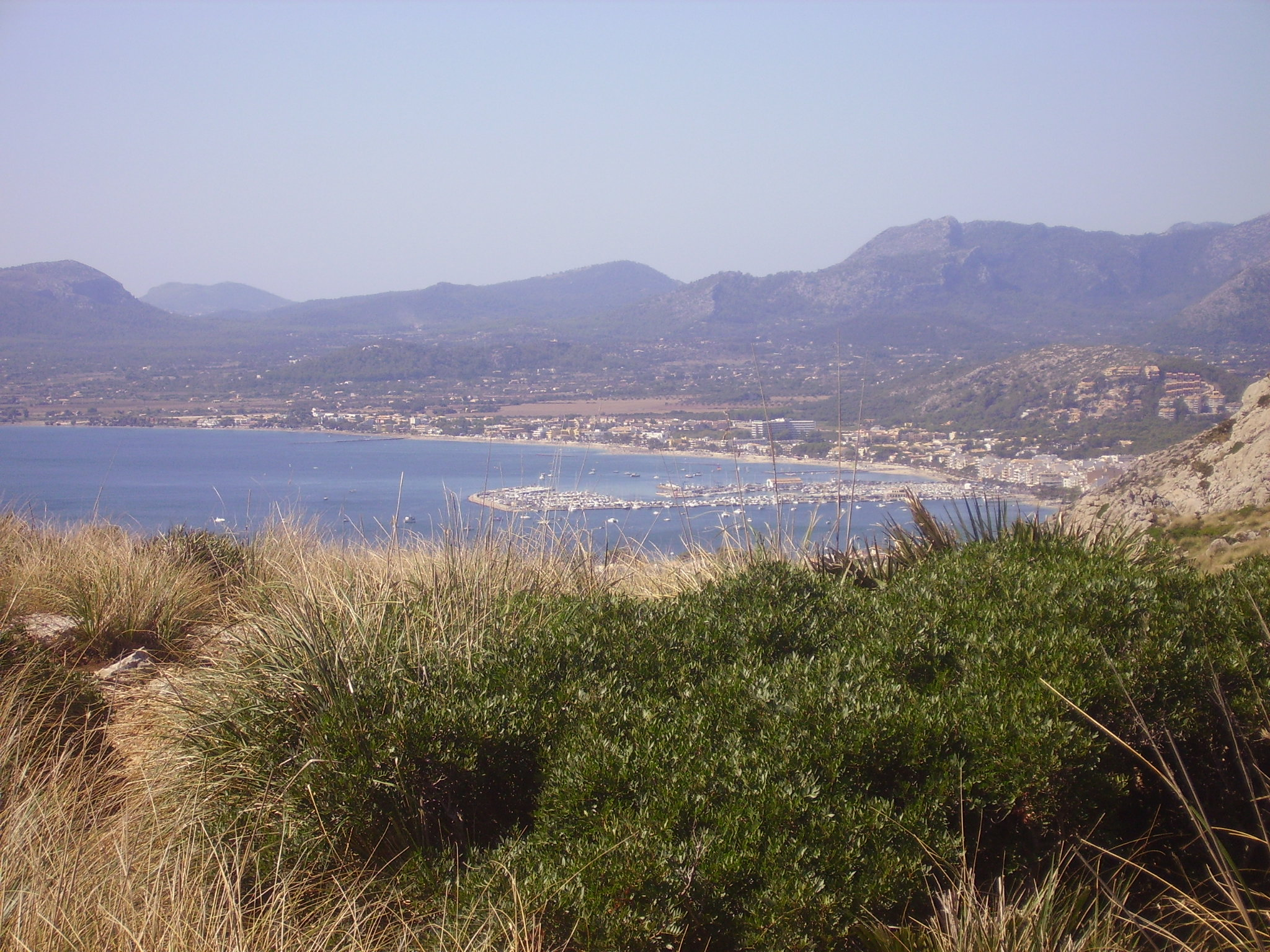
Views over the harbour

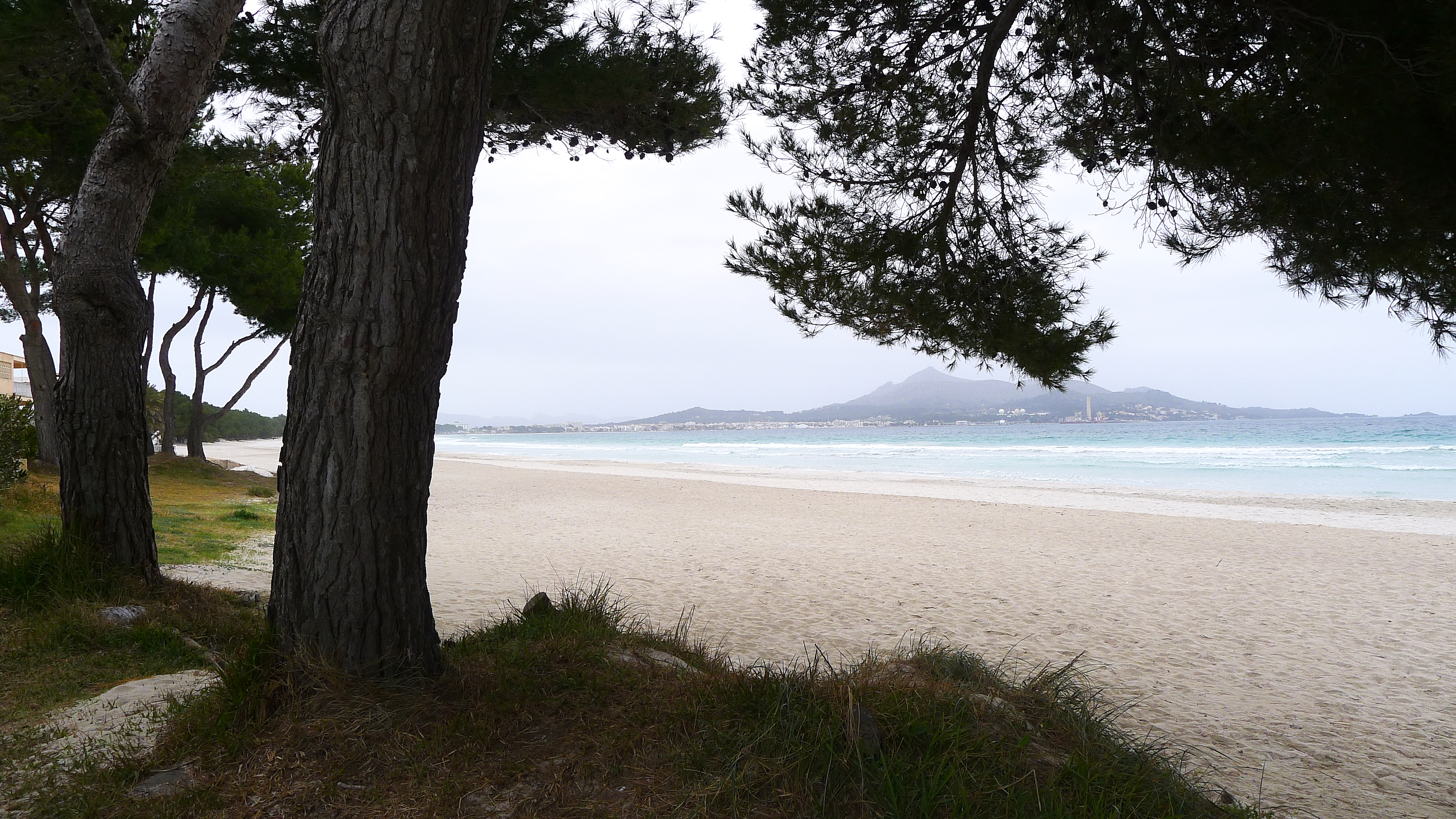
Beach about Llenaire

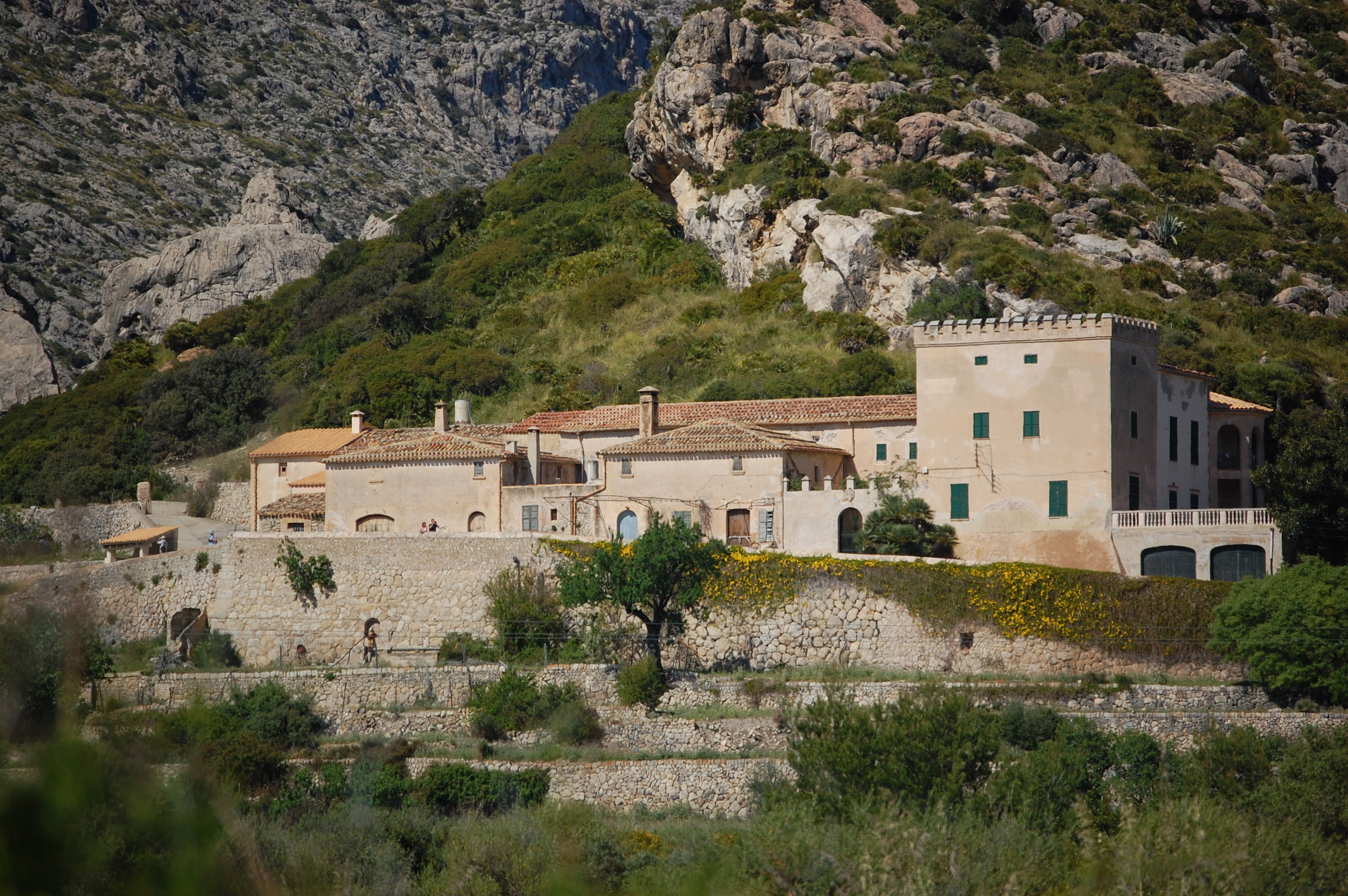
Finca de Boquer, near Boquer Valley

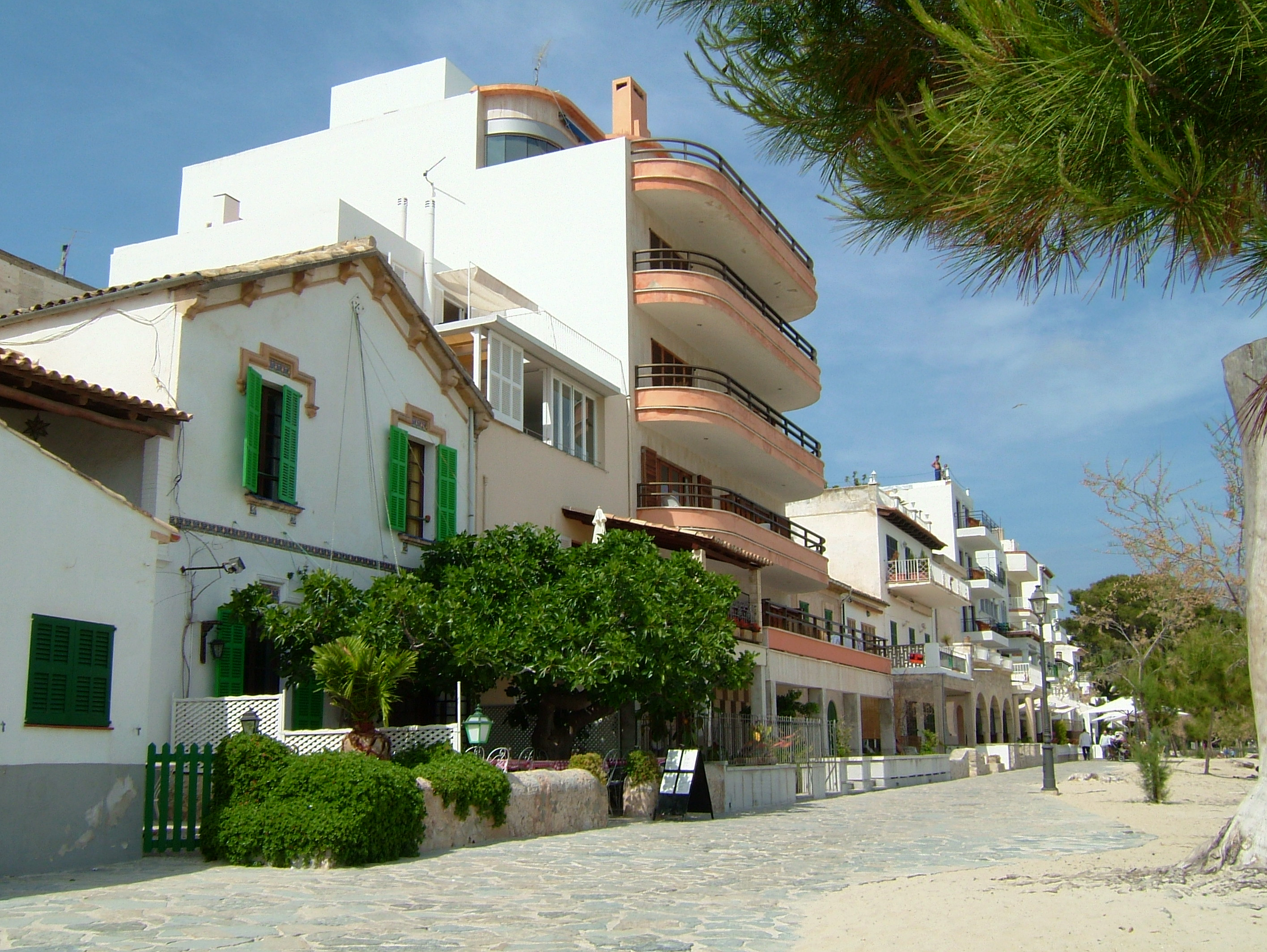
Pinewalk

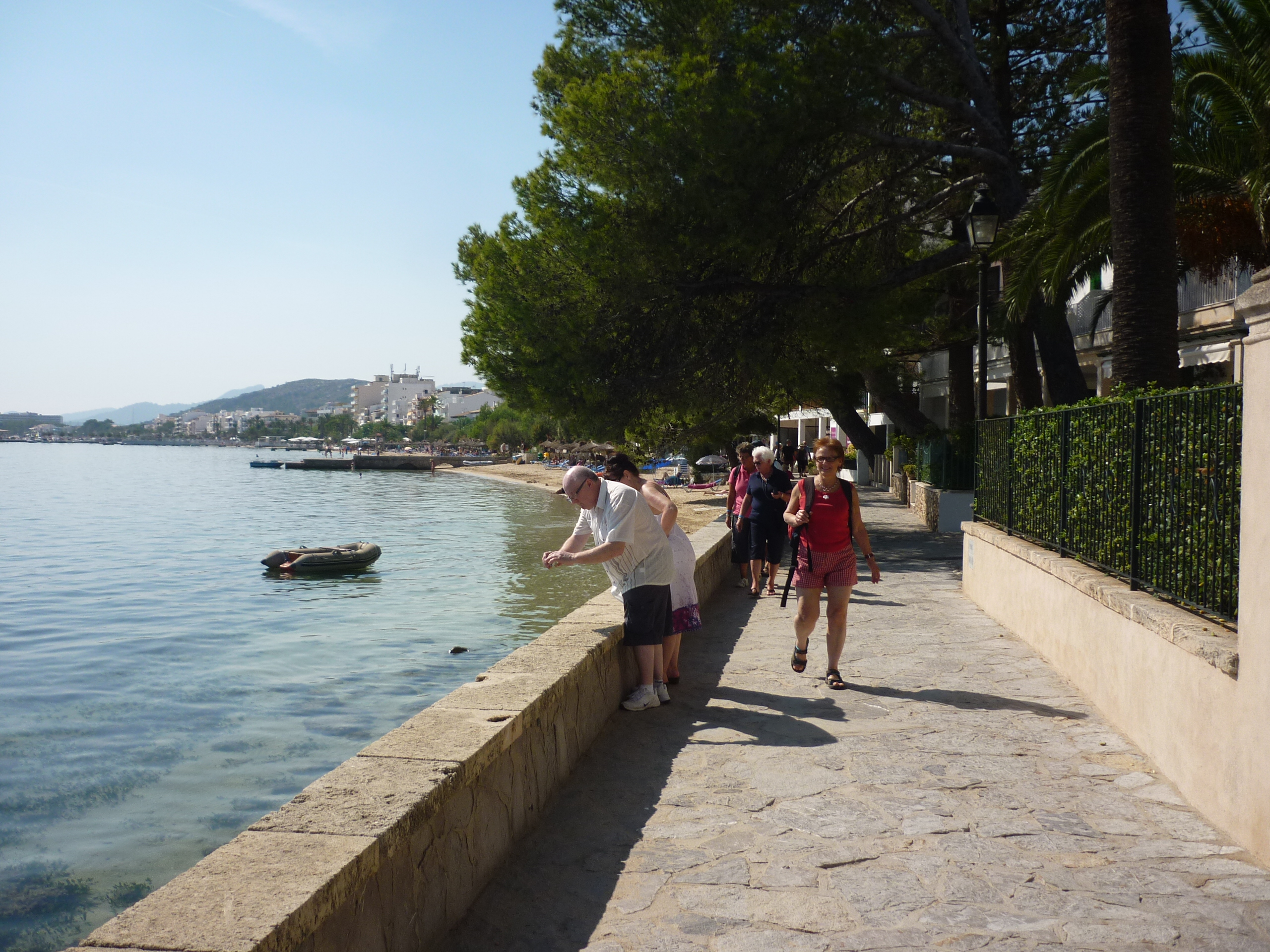
The Pine Walk

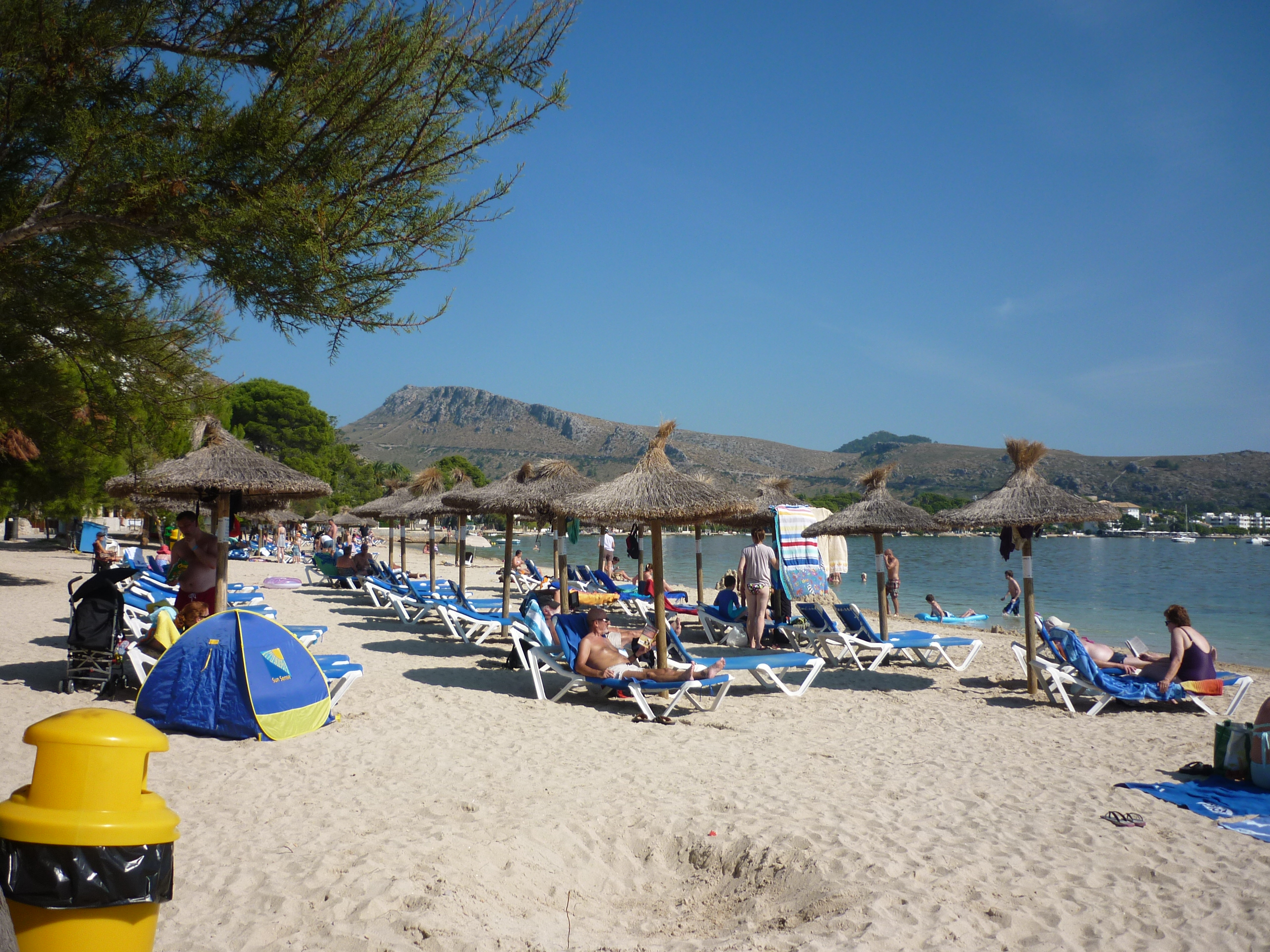
The small beach

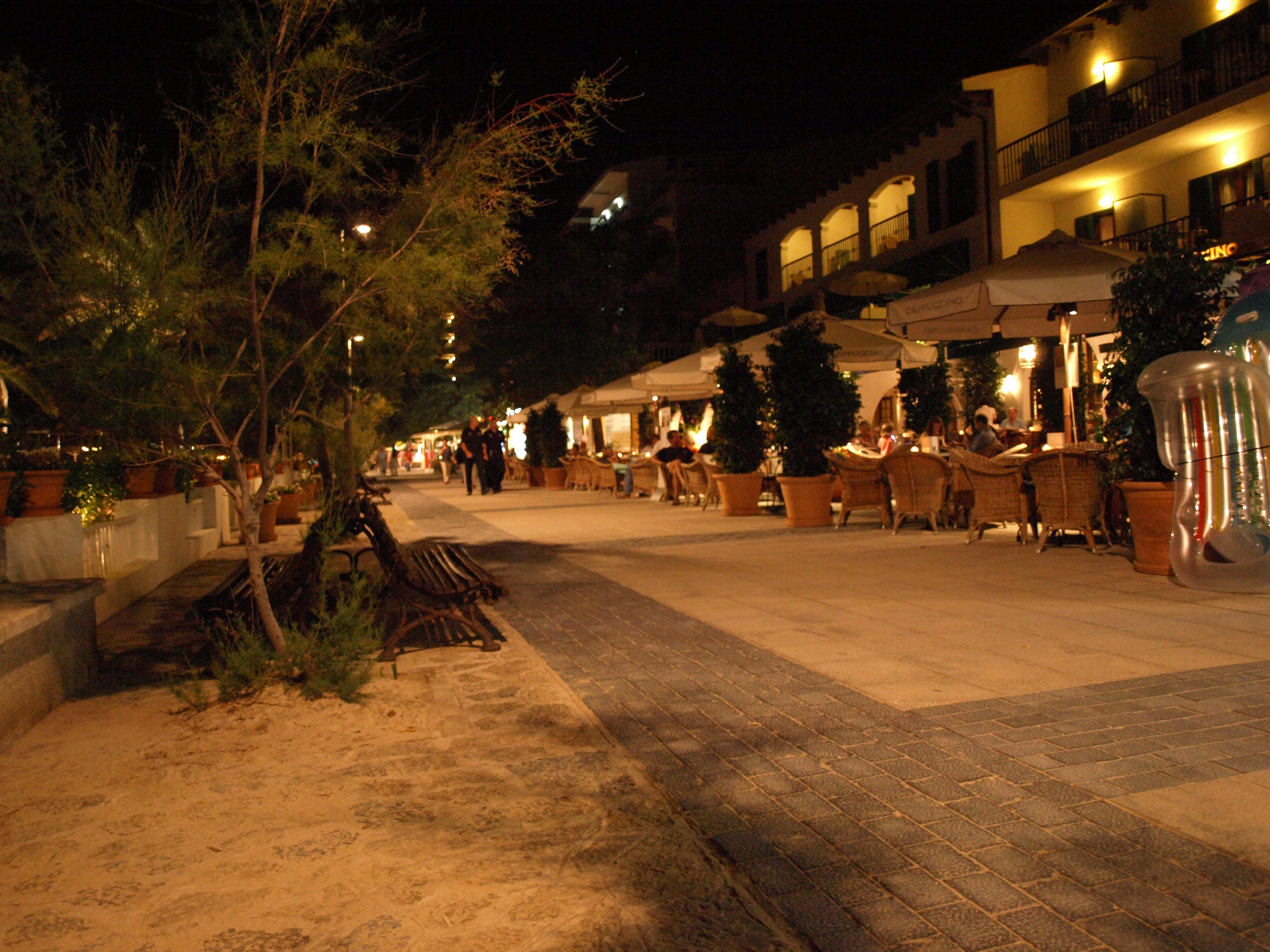
The Pine Walk at night

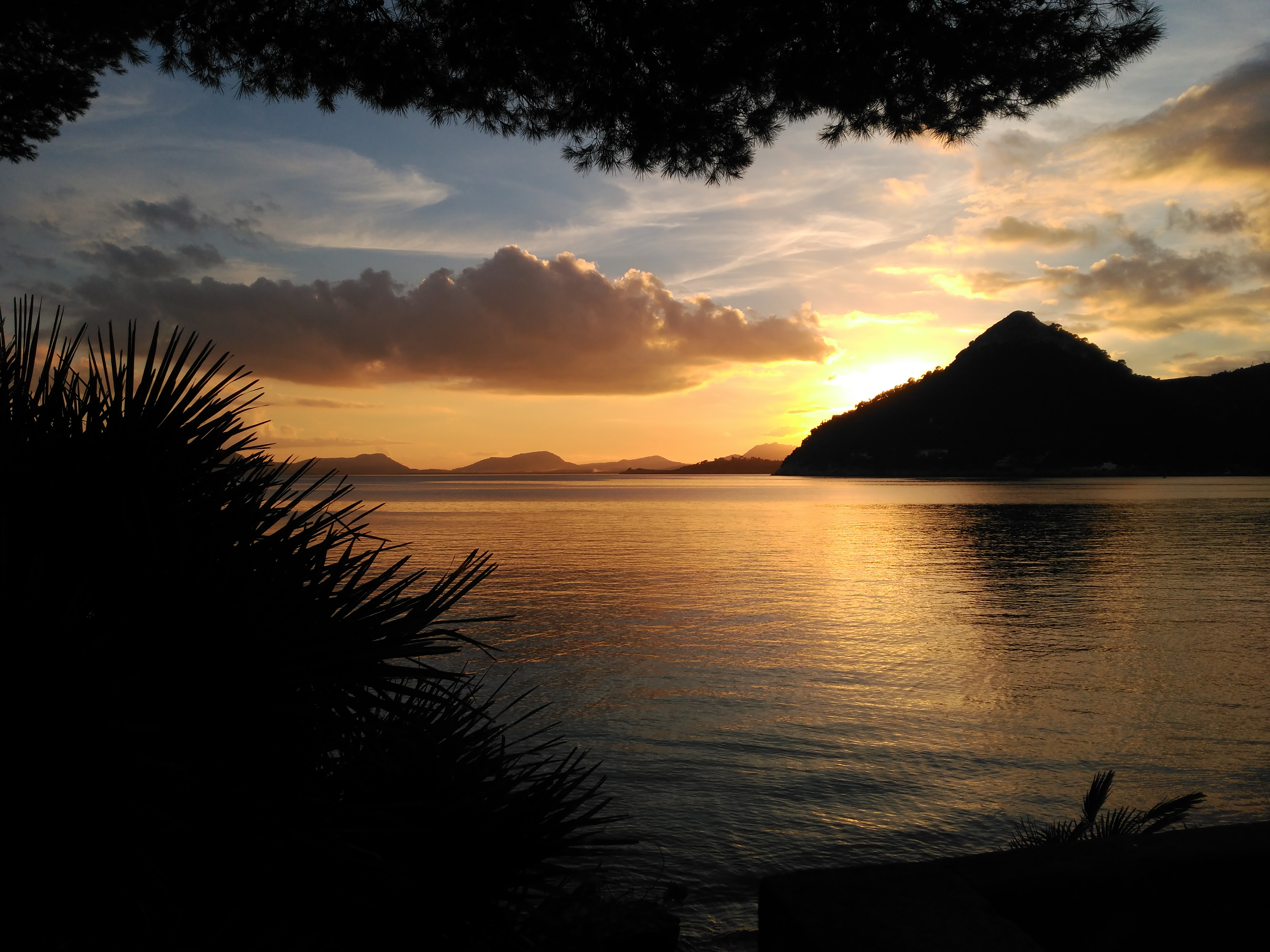
Sunset in the bay of Pollença
