= Bryn Celli Ddu =

Neolithic burial chamber on Anglesey

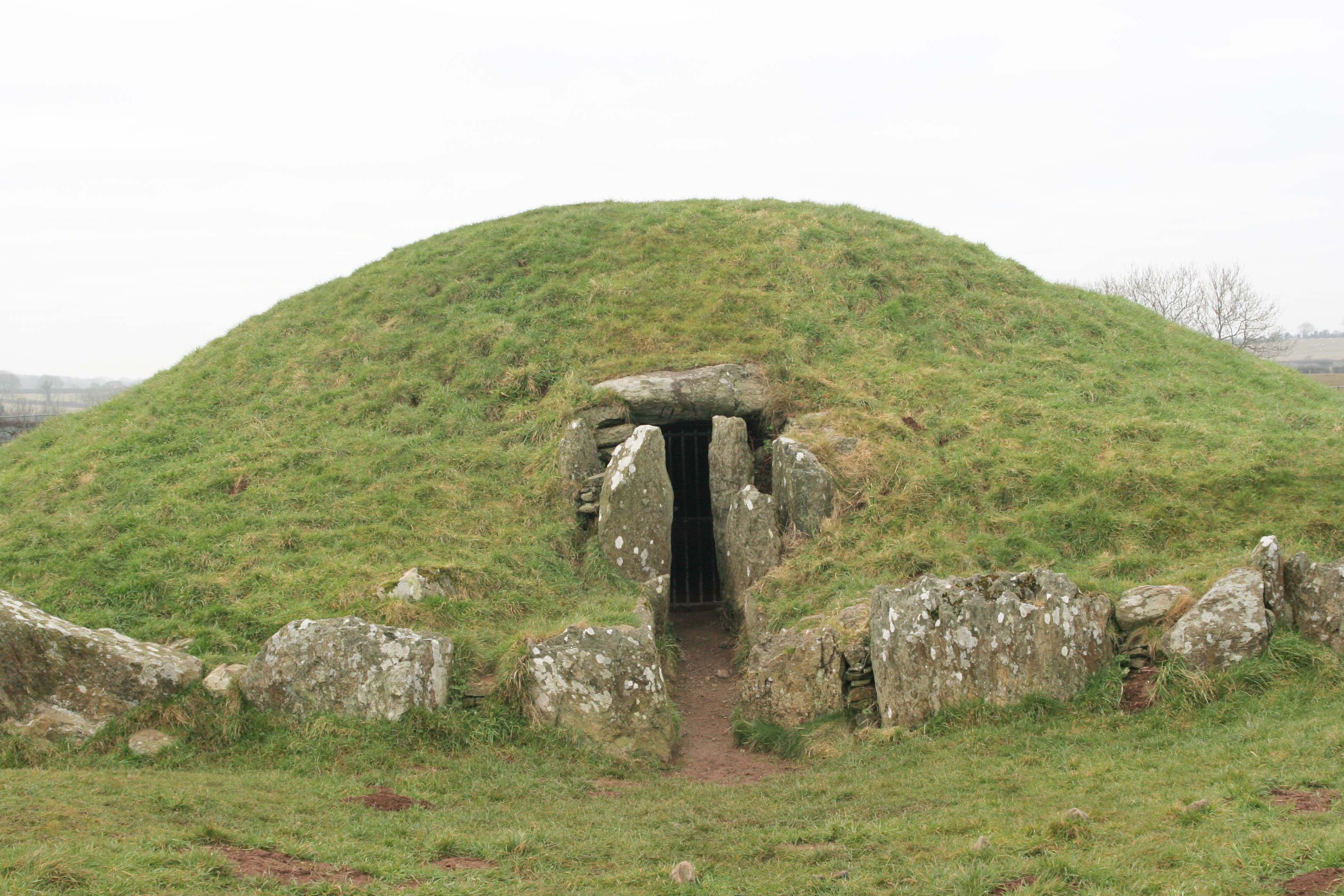
- Bryn Celli Ddu, northeast entrance

- Location in Wales, United Kingdom
- 53.2077°N 4.2361°W
- Type: Chambered tomb
- Periods: Neolithic
- Location: Wales, United Kingdom

History
- Built: Construction started; c. 3000 BC; Completed; c. 2000 BC

Site notes
- Material: Stone
- Excavation dates: 1928-1929
- Archaeologists: Wilfrid Hemp
- Condition: Excellent
- Public access: Yes
- Website: cadw.wales.gov.uk

Scheduled monument
- Reference no.: AN002

Bryn Celli Ddu (Welsh pronunciation: [ˌbrɪn kɛɬi ˈðɨː]) is a prehistoric site on the Welsh island of Anglesey located near Llanddaniel Fab. Its name means 'the mound in the dark grove'. It was archaeologically excavated between 1928 and 1929. Visitors can get inside the mound through a stone passage to the burial chamber, and it is the centrepiece of a major Neolithic Scheduled Monument in the care of Cadw. The presence of a mysterious pillar within the burial chamber, the reproduction of the 'Pattern Stone', carved with sinuous serpentine designs, and the fact that the site was once a henge with a stone circle, and may have been used to plot the date of the summer solstice have all attracted much interest.

== The monument ==
Bryn Celli Ddu is generally considered to be one of the finest passage tombs in Wales. Its passage and burial chamber are complete, and it is still buried under a mound or cairn, reinstated following its excavation in 1929. Many stone chambered cairns have lost these features. As it now stands, the passage is 8.4 m (28 ft) long, the first 3.4 m (11 ft) being unroofed with a pair of portal stones. The main passage has walls of vertical rock slabs, roofed by a series of stone lintels. The mound, being substantially smaller than as originally made, no longer completely encloses the burial chamber, so the back wall is open to the air, allowing some natural light in.

Free-standing inside the burial chamber is a smooth pillar of blueschist, a metamorphic rock, some 2 m (6.6 ft) high, with a very rounded shape.

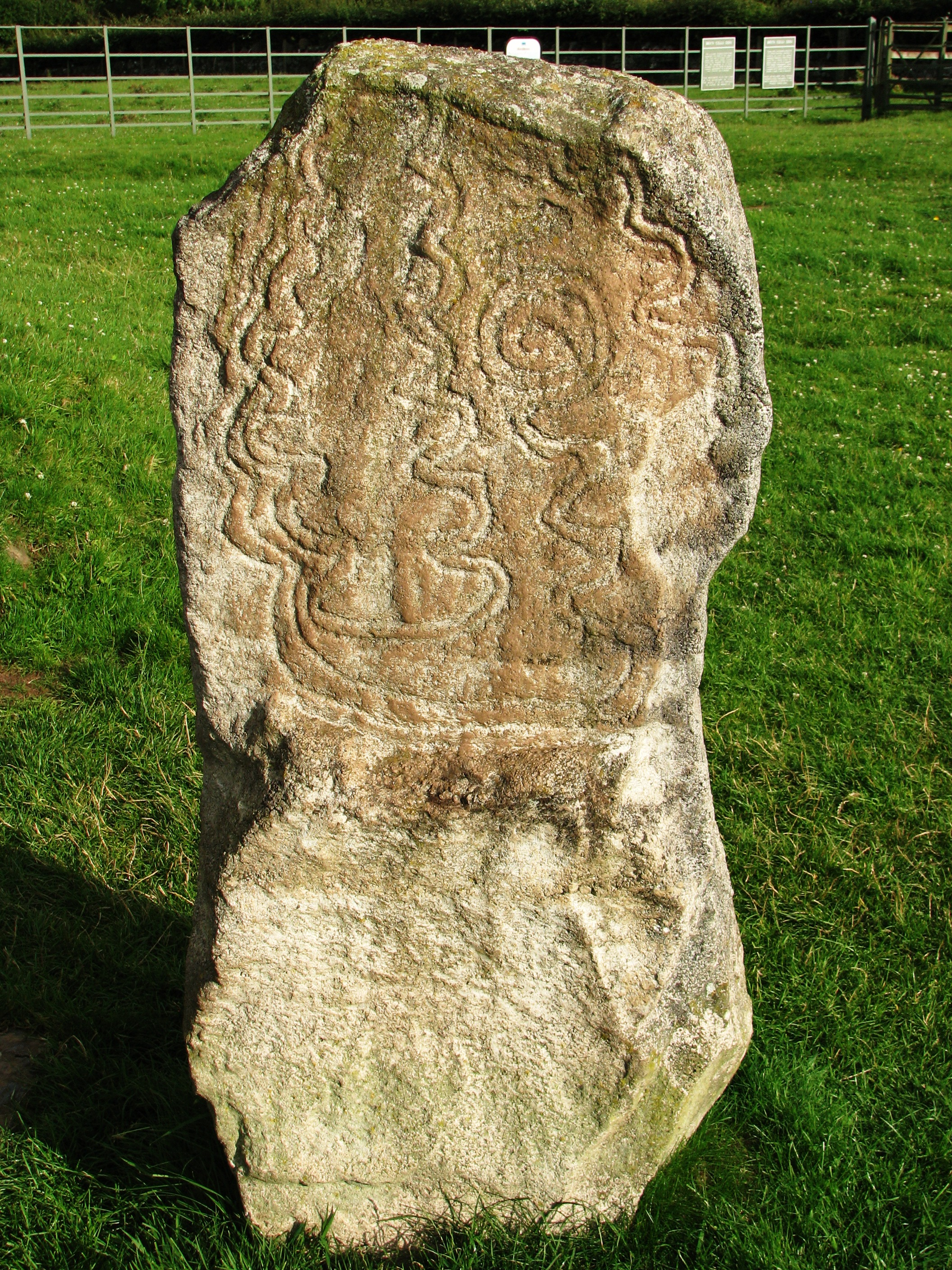
Bryn Celli Ddu 'Pattern Stone' replica

Beyond the back wall of the chamber, in a location that would once have been within the mound, is a replica of the 'Pattern Stone'. This was found buried under the mound, and has been put standing up in what is thought to have been its original location at a time when the site was a henge rather than a tomb. The patterns take the form of sinuous serpentine shapes that wind around both sides of the stone. Inside the tomb another stone has a small spiral pattern chipped into it, although its authenticity has been questioned.

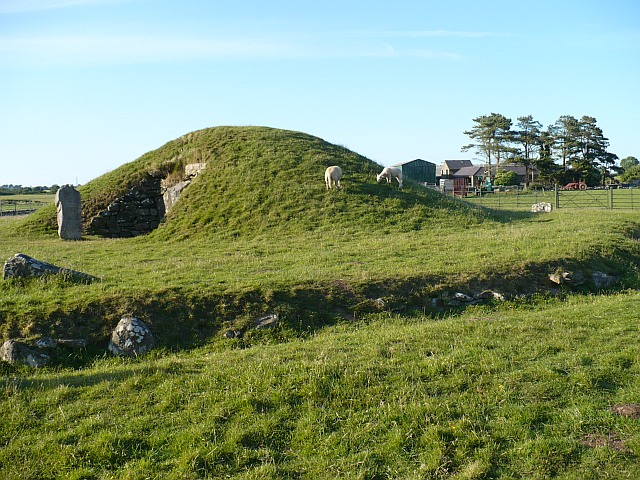
Bryn Celli Ddu kerbstones and henge ditch

Outside the tomb, a ring of kerbstones shows the original extent of the mound, and they also follow the line of the ditch of the earlier henge monument. Three of the stones, visible within the cairn mound, are thought to be from the stone circle of that time.

The passage is roughly aligned with the Summer Solstice sunrise, such that for some weeks around the summer solstice, sunlight can find its way through to the back wall of the burial chamber.

The monument is part of a cluster of Neolithic and Bronze Age features. Two further cairns have been identified just to the south of Bryn Celli Ddu, while in the field immediately to the west is a standing stone, and a rock outcrop with cupmarks carved into it.

== Original uses ==
The earliest identified remains at the site are a row of five postholes previously thought to have been contemporary with the tomb. Radiocarbon dating of pine charcoal from two of the pits, carried out in 2006, showed these to date from around 4000 BC, putting them at the end of the Mesolithic, 1,000 years before the next phase of use. Their purpose, however, is unknown.

=== Henge ===
Around 3000 BC, a henge monument was constructed. An outer circular bank and ditch would have defined the boundary, although only the ditch survives, some 21 m (69 ft) across. Within this, a stone circle would have provided the focus for a site of ritual significance. A ring of 17 stones formed an oval, many being in matched pairs either side of the centre. Cremated human remains were buried at the base of some of them, suggesting a central 'altar' During this period a pit was dug within the henge; a single human ear-bone was buried, and covered with a flat slab. A second stone known as 'The Pattern Stone' lay nearby, with the serpentine patterning on it. It is thought this would have stood upright within the henge, as the patterns cover both sides.

=== Passage grave ===
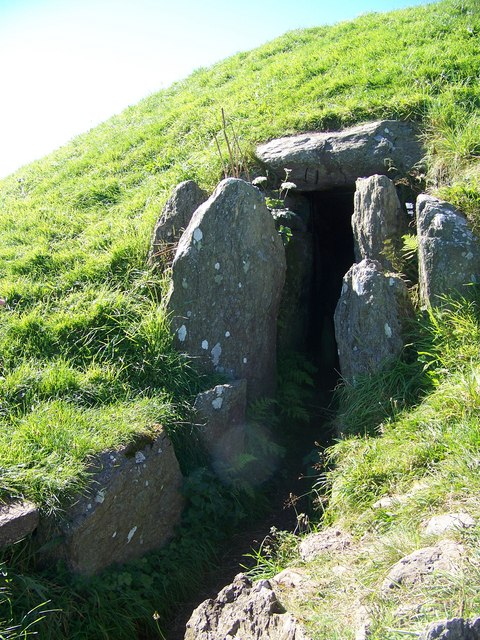
Passage entrance to Bryn Celli Ddu

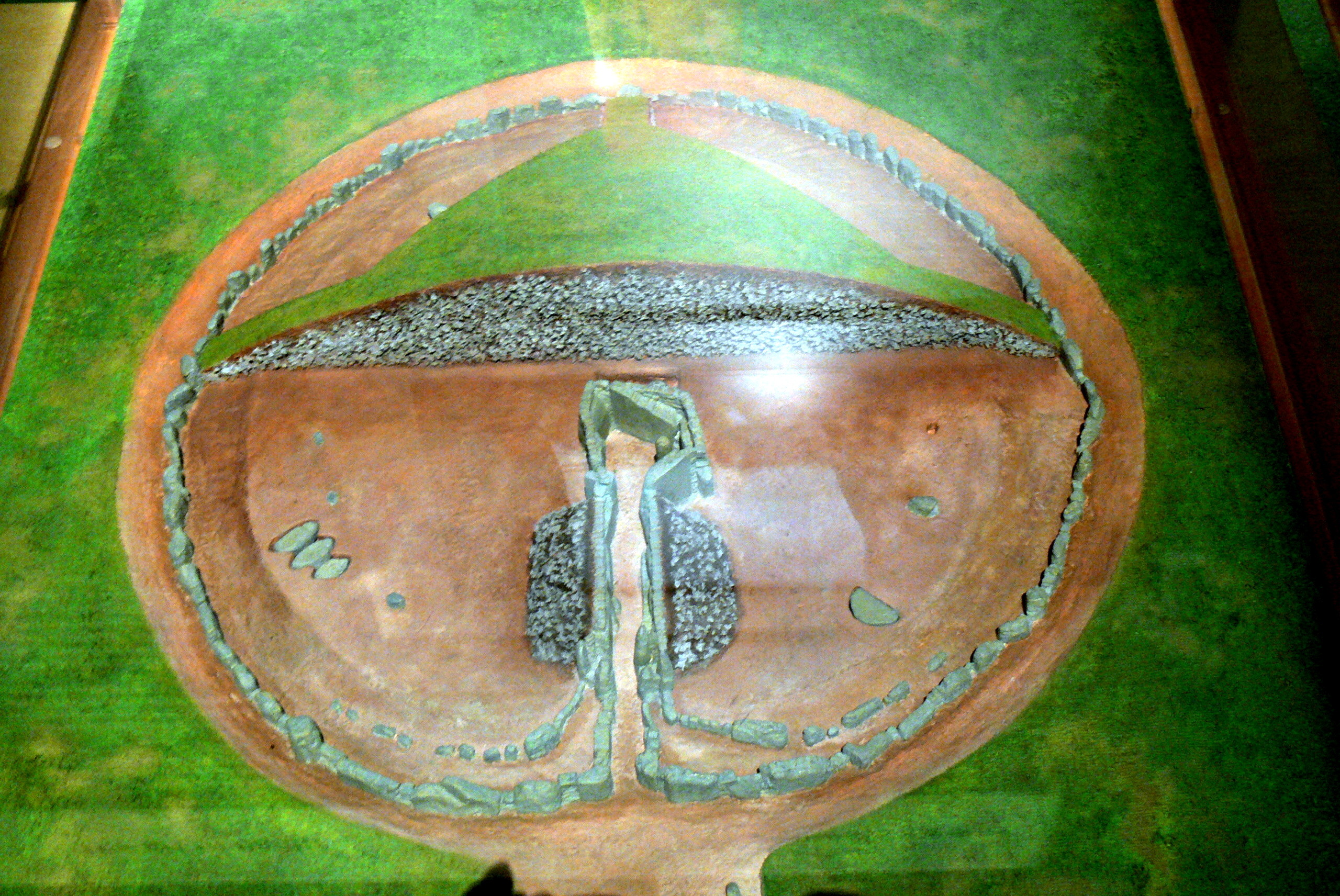
Model of Bryn Celli Ddu in the National Museum of Wales, Cardiff

Around 1,000 years after the henge was built, the site was radically altered. All but one of the standing stones were intentionally damaged, some were knocked over and six were smashed with heavy stones. In its place, a passage grave was built. Much larger than the mound now remaining, it would have had a complete circle of kerbstones following the line of the old henge ditch, creating an impressive retaining wall around the mound, 26 m (85 ft) across. The burial chamber would have been entirely enclosed within the mound, rather than the back wall being open to the air, as in the reconstructed mound now seen. Individual human bones, both burnt and unburnt, were found within the chamber and passage, suggesting a variety of funeral practices, but in all cases re-using the tomb, and clearing aside the old remains.

At the end of its period of use the tomb was 'closed' by means of a large stone set across the entrance, between the two portal stones.

== Archaeology ==
The earliest archaeological descriptions date to around 1800. In 1796, it was included on a list of Anglesey cromlechs in the Cambrian Register. In 1802, John Skinner made a "Ten Days' Tour Through the Isle of Anglesea", an account of which he wrote up, but never published, describing the numerous archaeological sites he visited. It was finally published as a supplement to Archaeologia Cambrensis in 1908. On his visit to Bryn Celli Ddu, he was told how the passage tomb had been discovered a generation before, by a farmer looking for useful stone. The sight of the pillar stone had initially unnerved the discoverer, but the prospect of treasure tempted him back, and he uprooted the pillar.

Having suffered depredation of the more movable stones of the site, the monument was excavated by Wilfrid Hemp from 1928-1929. He revealed much of the sequence of use on the site, and found the 'Pattern Stone'. It has since been moved to the National Museum of Wales and replaced with a replica standing outside the back wall, but within the area of the original mound, and close to the spot where it was found. The Pillar was set back upright, and the earth and stone mound covering the passage and chamber was reinstated, but clearly there was much less material available than had been used originally. Some additional concrete roof supports have also been added at some point.

Norman Lockyer, who in 1906 published the first systematic study of megalithic astronomy, had argued that Bryn Celli Ddu marked the summer solstice. This was ridiculed at the time, but research by Christopher Knight and Robert Lomas in 1997-1998 showed it to be true. Knight and Lomas also claimed that year-round alignments allowed the site to be used as an agricultural calendar. Steve Burrow, curator of Neolithic archaeology at Amgueddfa Cymru (National Museum of Wales), has more recently supported the case for summer solstice alignment. This alignment links Bryn Celli Ddu to a handful of other sites, including Maes Howe, Orkney and Newgrange, Ireland, both of which point to the winter solstice. It has also been suggested that a feature similar to the 'lightbox' at Newgrange may be matched at Bryn Celli Ddu.

=== Multi-period landscape ===
Between 2015 and 2020, the 'Bryn Celli Ddu Public Archaeology Project' has been engaged in studies of the wider landscape around the site. This is a partnership between Cadw and Manchester Metropolitan University with the aim of involving local communities in archaeological investigation. This has resulted in study of known ancient rock art on a nearby outcrop, and also identified and uncovered a number of other rock outcrops close by that have 'cup mark' decorations chipped into them. A second burial chamber, 50 meters to the south of the extant one, had been leveled, but as part of the project a 2019 excavation has revealed a large circular burial cairn which radio-carbon dating has placed at 1900 BC, which is over a thousand years after the earlier passage grave was built.

== Media ==
The serpentine pattern and the passage tomb featured strongly in the short animated film, Songs from Stones, about some of Anglesey's evocative archaeological sites and artefacts, produced as part of the Cultural Olympiad in 2012.

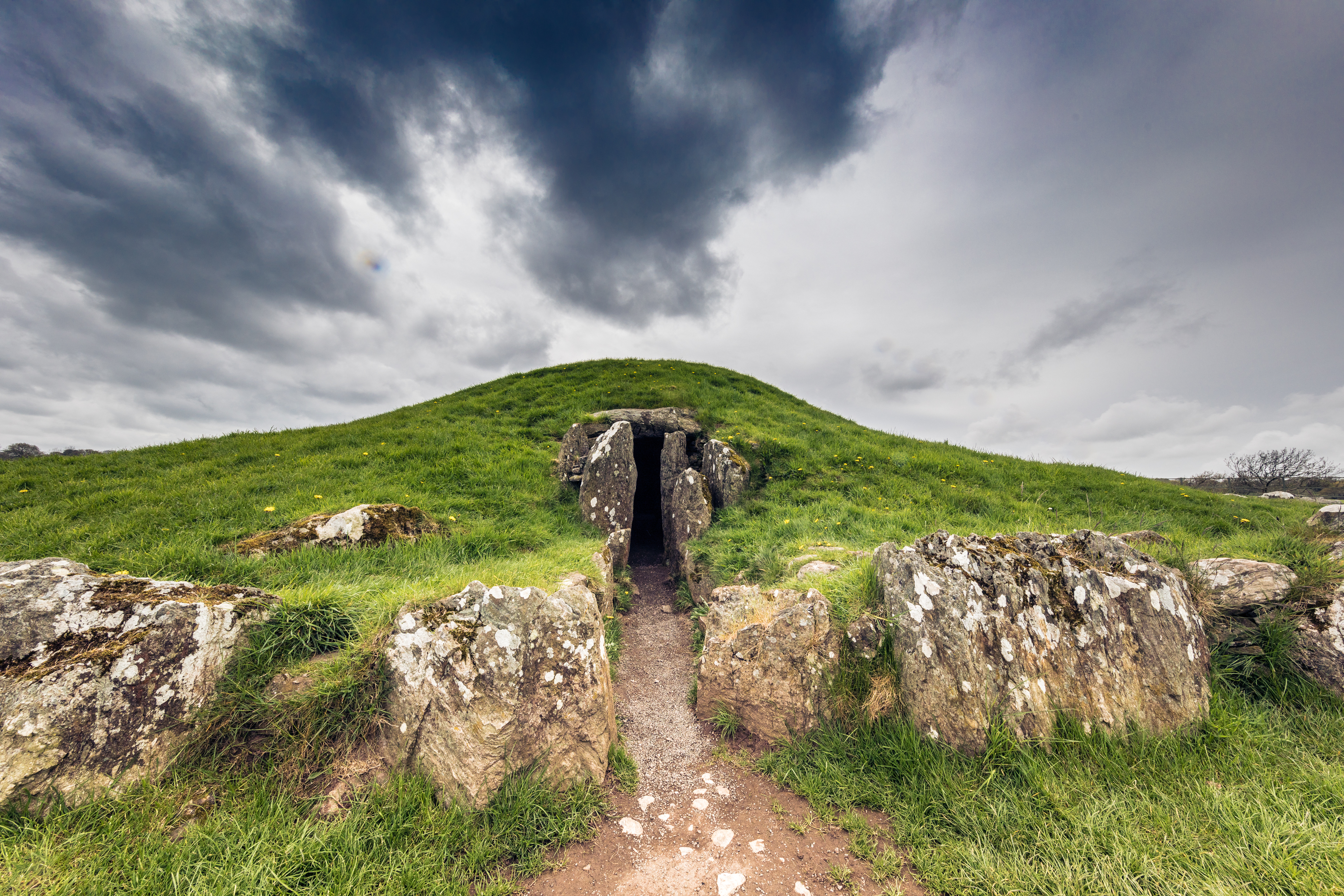
Entrance to Bryn Celli Ddu

The HeritageTogether project has used photogrammetry to create 3D models of the site and the standing stone.

Media company Mint Motion have produced an animated video of the site's development over time, and a flythrough of a pointcloud model of the site (see external links below).

The site was featured and explored in an episode of the US reality television series Expedition Unknown.

== Modern history ==
The site is used by the Anglesey Druid Order in ceremonies that celebrate the eight wheel of the year pagan festivals, including the summer and winter solstices.

== Gallery ==
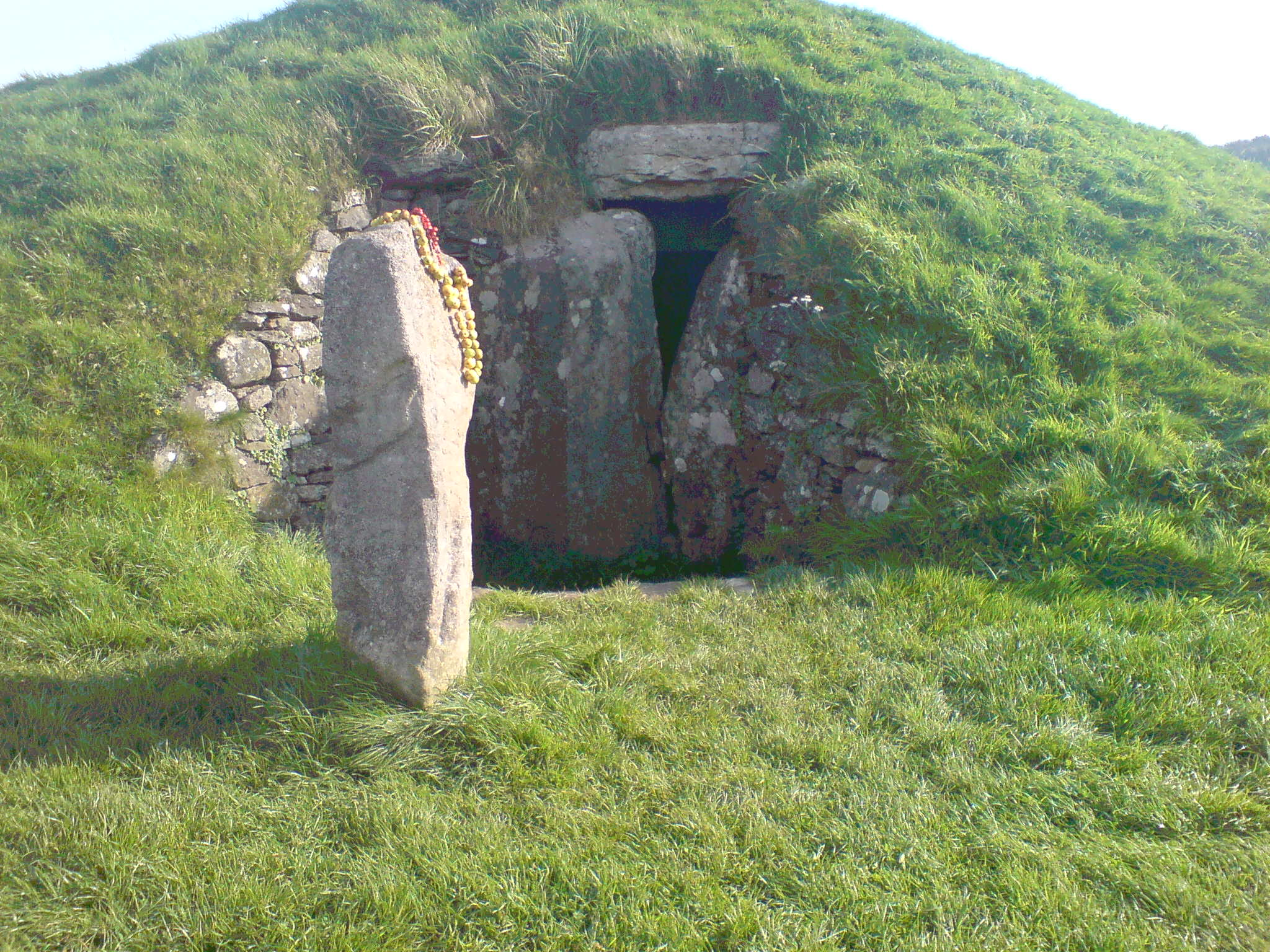
South-west side. A replica of the decorated stone stands outside the south-west opening in the burial chamber.

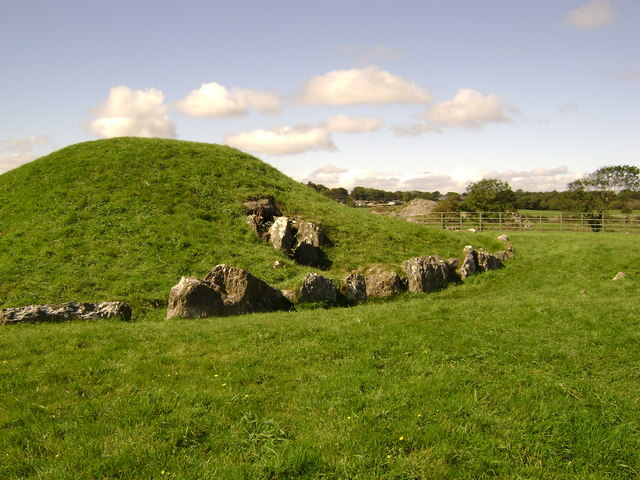
Entrance, portal stones and kerbstones on east side

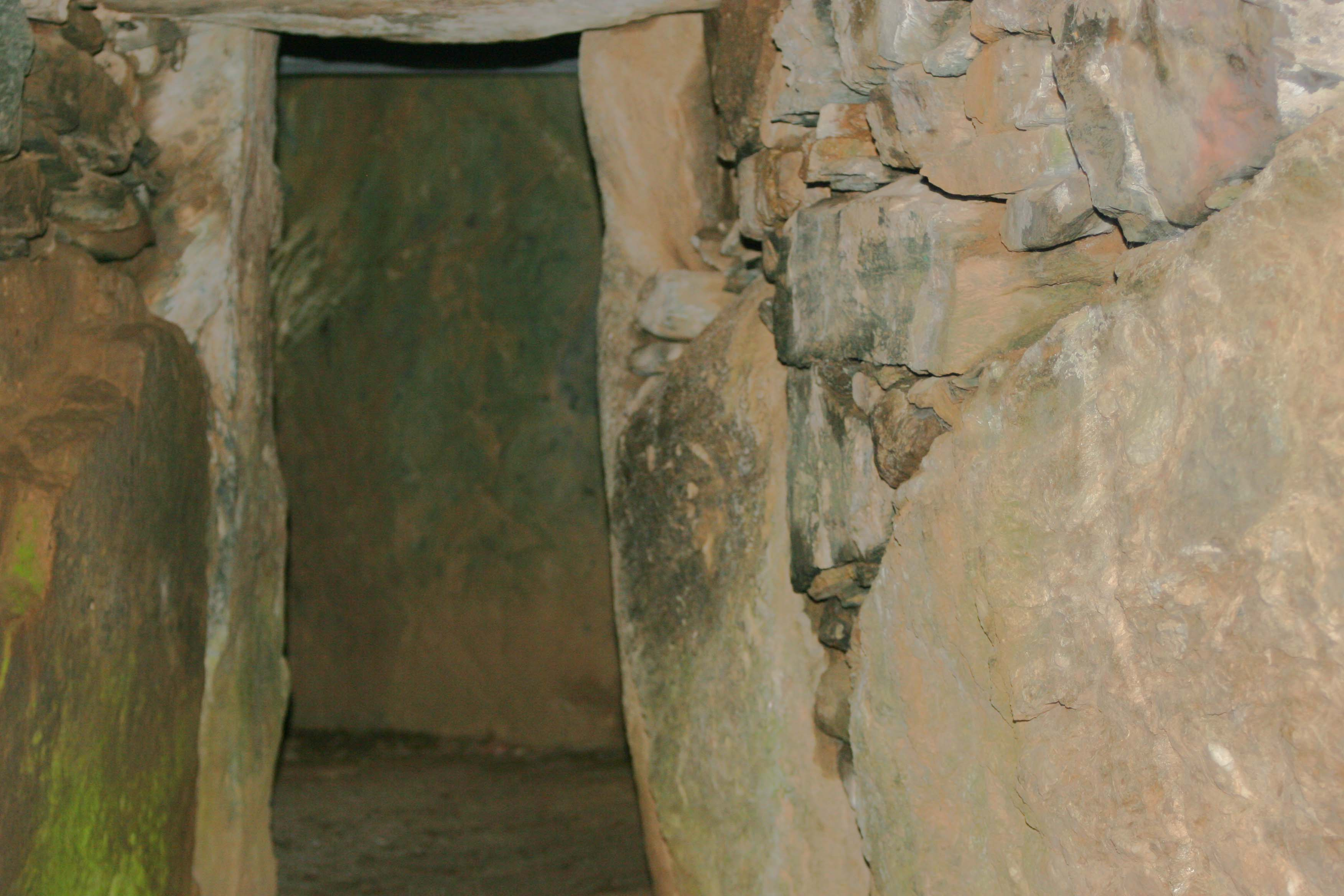
Internal view of the passage

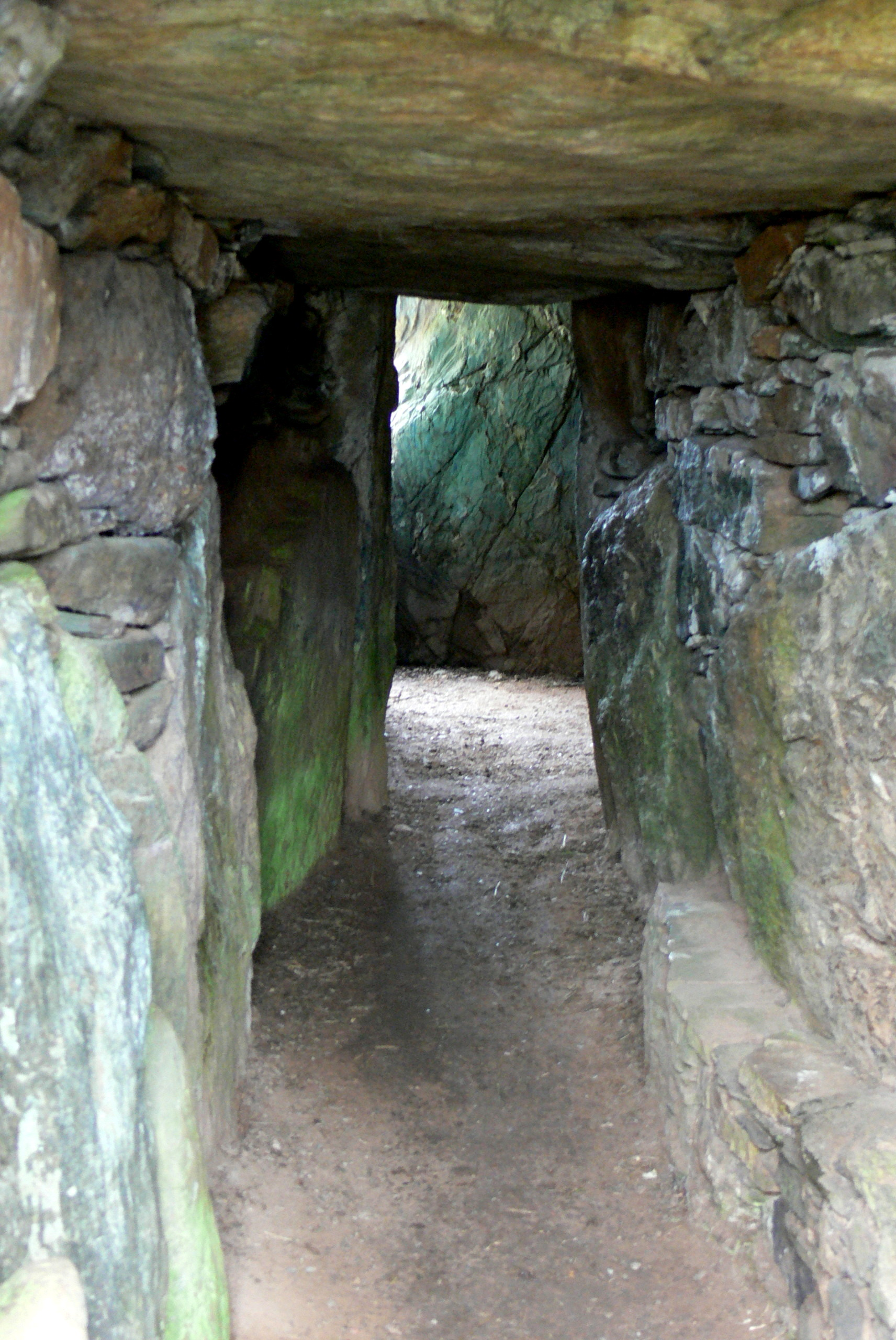
Passageway to interior

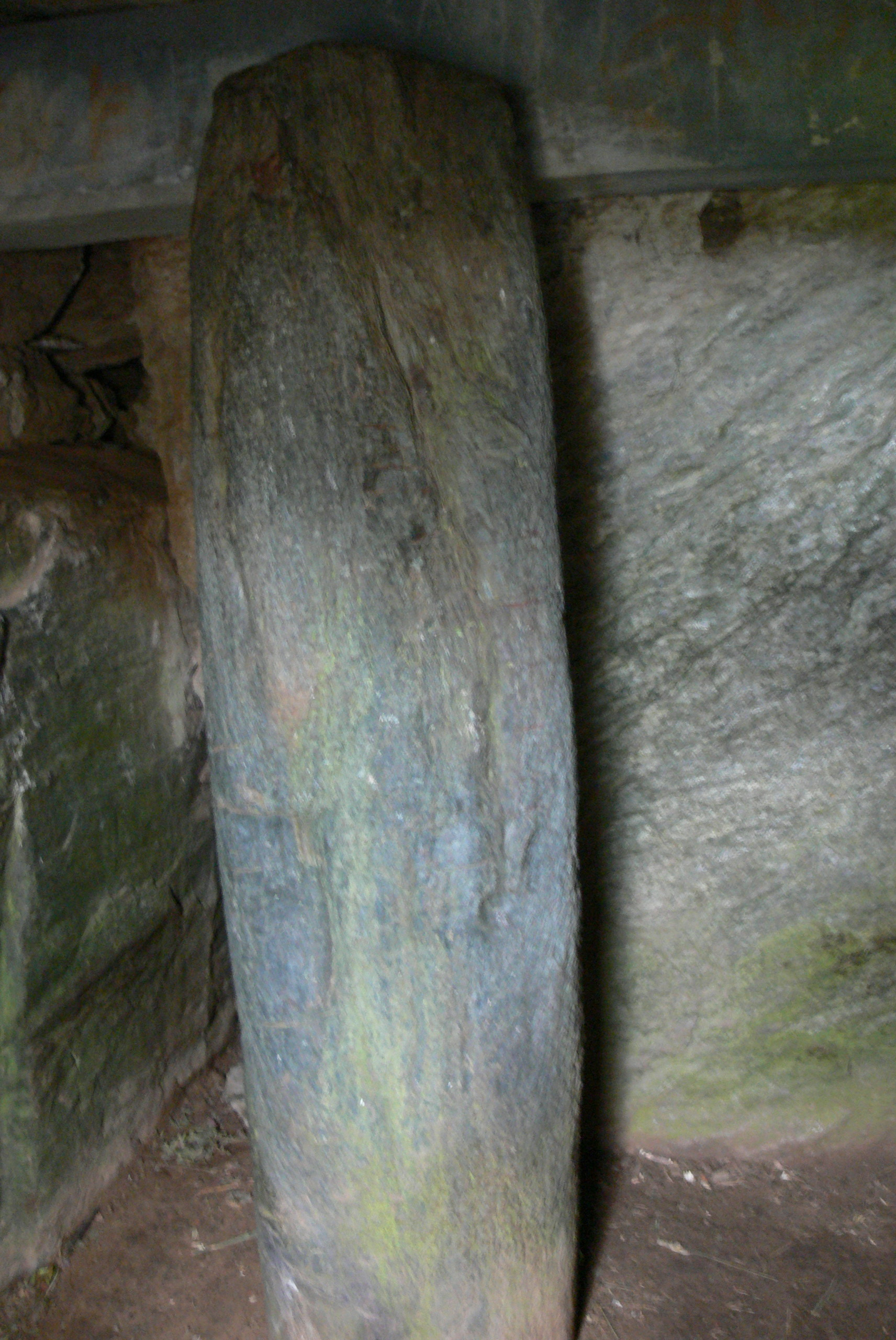
Pillar stone

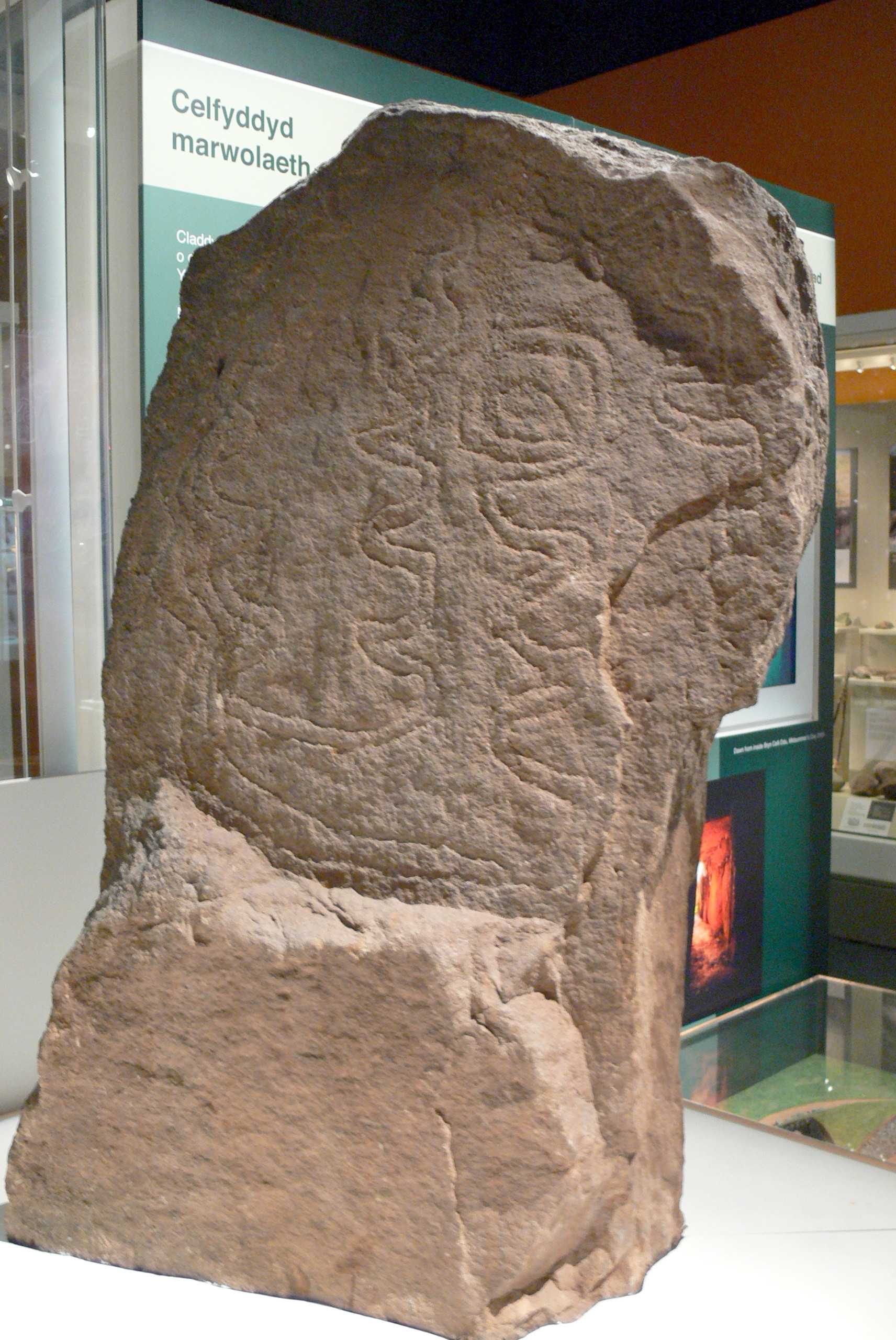
Original stone with serpentine design, found within the chamber, now in the National Museum of Wales.

== See also ==
- List of Scheduled Monuments in Anglesey
- List of Cadw properties
