= Hypogeum of Cala Sant Vicenç =

Set of Bronze Age caves in Pollença, Spain

- Location within Spain
- 39.9153°N 3.0485°E
- Periods: Bronze Age
- Location: Mallorca, Spain

History
- Built: 1700—1500 BC

Site notes
- Archaeologists: Wilfrid James Hemp

The Hypogeum of Cala Sant Vicenç is a set of caves (hypogea) in Cala Sant Vicenç, on the Spanish island of Mallorca. It dates back to the Bronze Age (1,700—1,500 BC). Today, eight caves are visible, though when they were studied by Wilfrid James Hemp, there were fifteen. Some features of the caves are modern (such as the hole at the back of Cave 7). The taula-like statue at the entrance to the site is also modern.
