= Vicenç =

Vicenç may refer to:

== People ==
- Josep Vicenç Foix (1893–1987), Catalan poet, writer and essayist
- Vicenç Cuyàs (1816–1839), Catalan opera composer
- Vicenç Vilarrubla (born 1981), Catalan Spanish cross-country skier

== See also ==
- Sant Vicenç (disambiguation)
