= Miquel Capllonch Rotger =

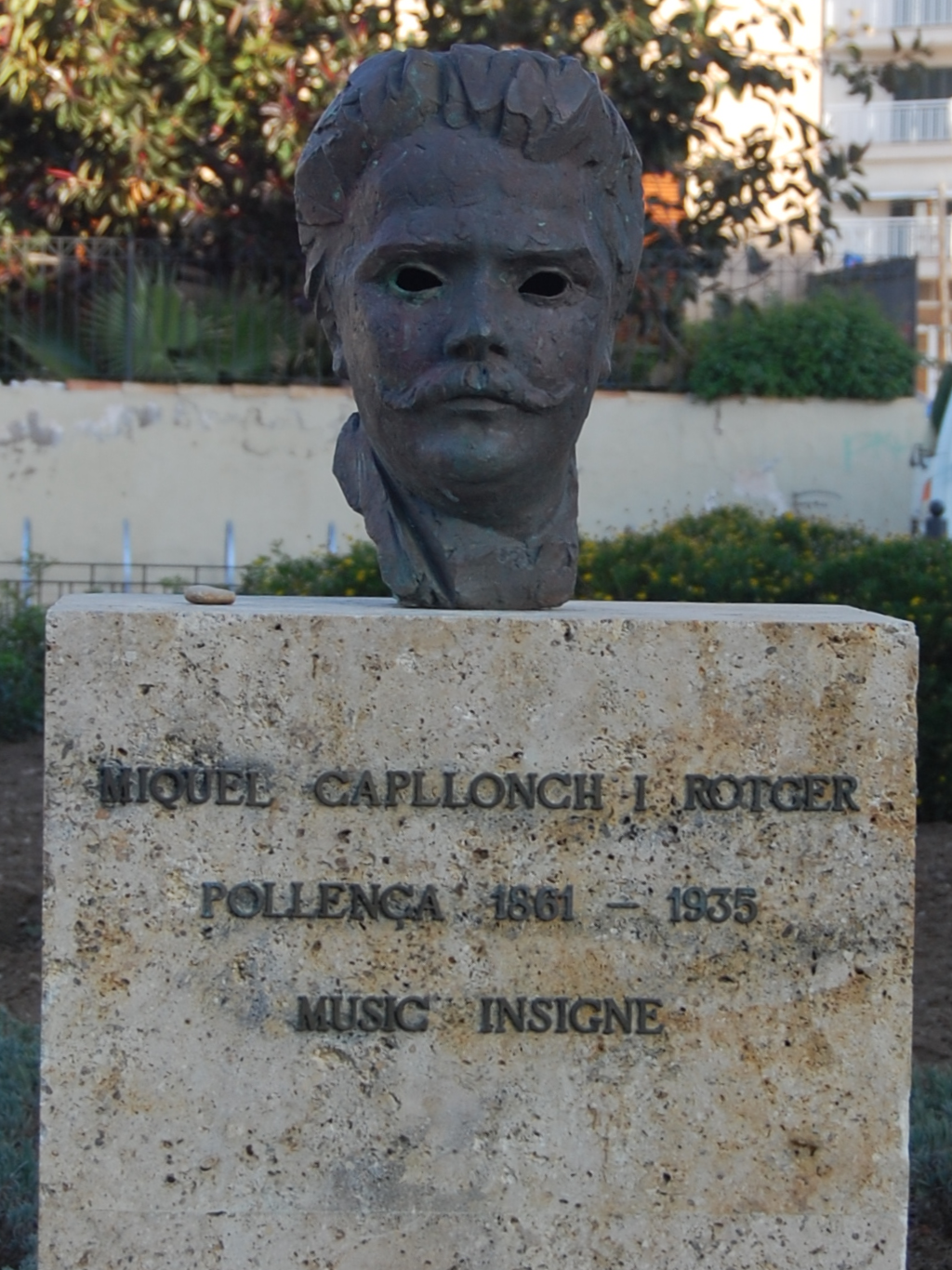
- Bronze bust in Placa de Miquel Capllonch, Port de Pollença
- Born: 14 January 1861
- Died: 21 December 1935 (aged 74); Pollença
- Education: Conservatory of Music in Madrid; Conservatory of Music in Berlin
- Occupations: Pianist; Composer

Miquel Capllonch Rotger (14 January 1861 in Pollença - 21 December 1935) was a Majorcan pianist and composer.

He studied music in Pollença with his cousin, Joan Rotger, organist of the parish of Pollença.

He continued his musical studies with William Massot and at the Conservatory of Music in Madrid, with teachers like Tragó, Galiana, Chapí and Hernando.

He then worked in Madrid with the Polish composer Weber. He obtained a grant from the Island's Council to complete studies in Germany, where he was a student at the Conservatory of Music in Berlin. Among his teachers there was Anton Rubinstein who would become a good friend. He taught music for the royal families of Prussia (the Hohenzollerns ) and Saxony, and gave concerts for European royalty.

In 1906 he married Gabriela Miteau with whom he had four children. In 1912 he moved with his family to Madrid, and three years later to Barcelona.

He died in Pollença on 21 December 1935 and is commemorated by a bronze bust (at 39.90772°N 3.08181°E) in the main square of Port de Pollença, Placa de Miquel Capllonch, which is named after him.

== Works ==
- Marxa pontifical
- Oratio pro discipulis
- La Salve
- Himne per cortesanes del Bon Jesús
- Nocturn en la bemoll major
- Nostalgia Op. 17 nº1.
- Tota Pulchra
- Càntic de la fe de Sant Pere
- Responsorium
- Càntic de la Sagrada Família
- Tot me vaig alegrar
- Ave Maries i Glòries
- A Sant Vicenç
- Cruçats de l'Amor Divino
- Mon cor no és orgullós
- Nit i dia
- Avui és diumenge
- Ara s'ha tornat al món de la tranquil litat
- Alborada de Pollença
- La ximbomba d'Artà
