= Boquer Valley =

- Val de Boquer
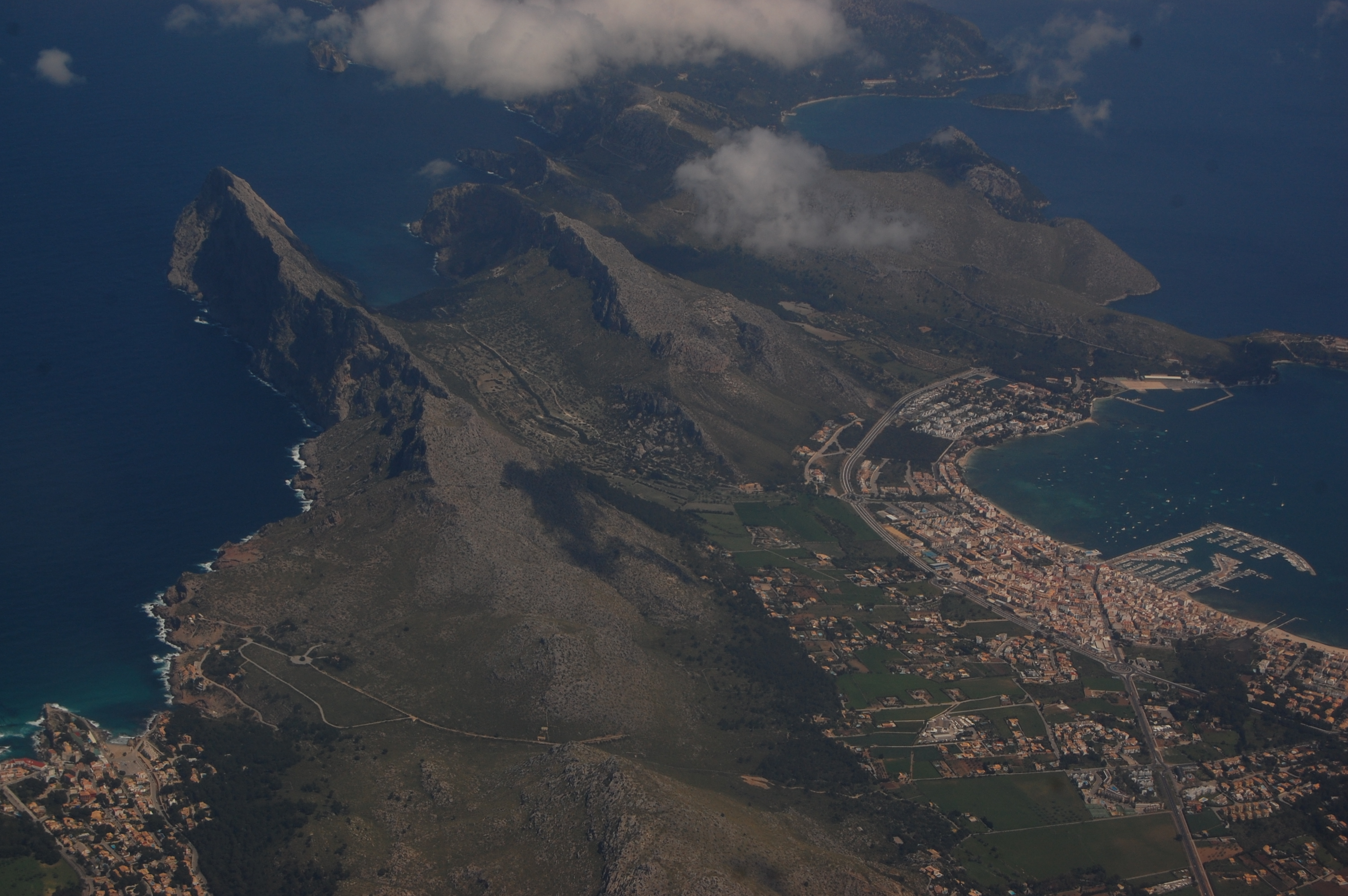
- Boquer Valley (centre) and Port de Pollença, from the air
- Length: 3 kilometres (1.9 mi) NE

Geography
- Location: Port de Pollença, Majorca
- Coordinates: 39.923°N 3.088°E
- Interactive map of Boquer Valley

The Boquer Valley (Catalan: Vall de Boquer) is a scenic valley running 3 kilometres (1.9 mi) north-east from the town of Port de Pollença, Majorca, to the sea at Cala Boquer. It is popular with bird-watchers for its migratory birds and resident Blue Rock Thrushes.

The ridge to the north-west, the Serra del Cavall Bernat, drops, on the other side, 360 metres (1,180 ft) to the sea. The ridge on the south-east side includes a peak called El Morral, which reaches 353 metres (1,158 ft).

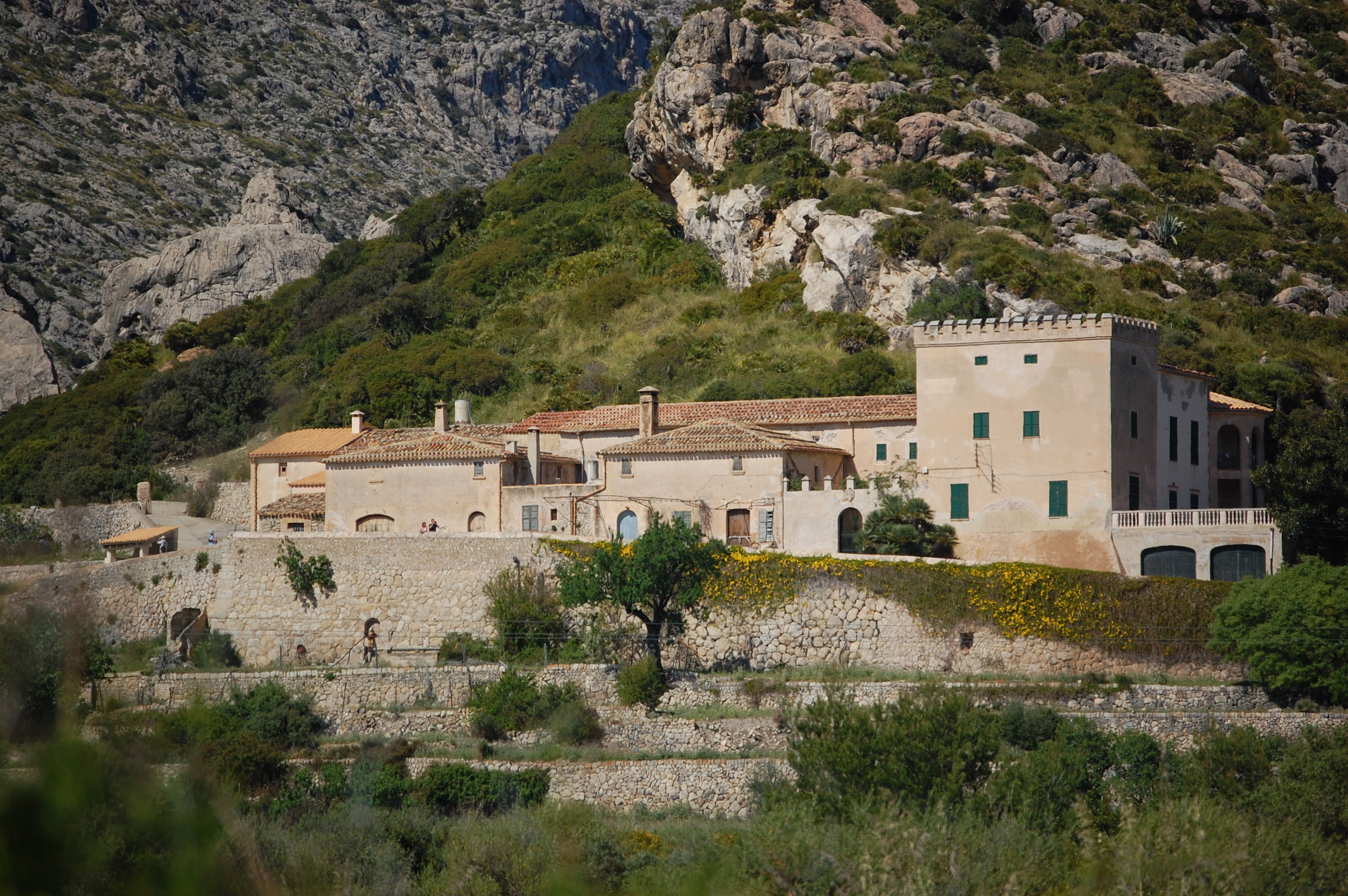
Finca Boquer

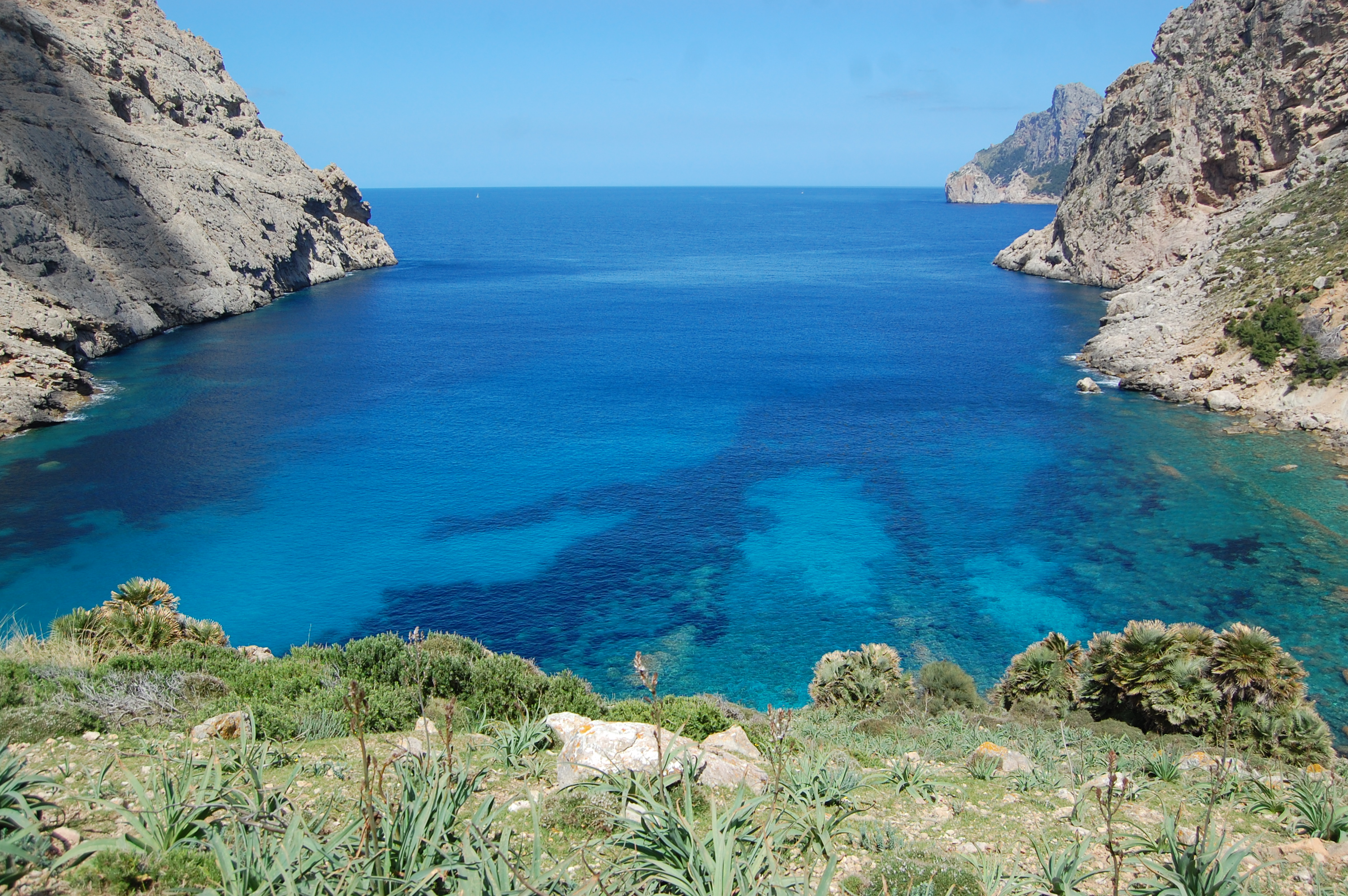
Cala Boquer

The valley is only accessible by foot. The inland end is marked by a finca called Finca Boquer. The Roman city of Bocchoris, which gives name to the valley, presumably lay here.
