= Sant Vicenç =

Sant Vicenç or Sant Vicent (Catalan for Saint Vincent) may refer to:

- Sant Vicenç de Castellet, municipality in the comarca of Bages
- Sant Vicenç de Montalt, municipality in the comarca of Maresme
- Sant Vicenç de Torelló, municipality in the comarca of Osona
- Sant Vicenç dels Horts, municipality in the comarca of the Baix Llobregat
- Sant Vicent del Raspeig, municipality in the province of Alicante, Spain
- Sant Vicent de sa Cala, hamlet in the Spanish island of Ibiza

== Churches ==
- Sant Vicenç d'Enclar, Andorra
- Sant Vicenç, Cardona, Catalonia

== See also ==
- Cala Sant Vicenç
- Vicenç (disambiguation)
