= Cala Sant Vicenç =

Resort town in Majorca, Spain

Coordinates: 39.9200°N 3.056°E

Cala Sant Vicenç is a small resort town in north-eastern Mallorca, in the municipality of Pollença, Spain. It consists of four small beaches: Cala Barques, Cala Clara, Cala Molins and Cala Carbó; hotels, villas and apartments plus a few bars, restaurants and shops catering for tourists. Located at one end of the town is the hypogeum of Cala Sant Vicenç, perhaps the most spectacular hypogeum on the island.

Cala Sant Vicenç offers one of the most characteristic images of the north of the island, the Cavall Bernat, a serrated mountain range that on this side has cliffs about 300 meters high and is one of the places most reflected in the paintings of artists who have passed through Pollença.
