= Atilio Boveri =

- Born: April 6, 1885; Rauch, Buenos Aires
- Died: February 17, 1949 (aged 63); Manuel B. Gonnet

Atilio Boveri was born in Rauch, Buenos Aires, Argentina on 6 April 1885. He was a leading figure in the visual arts of Argentina, who worked as a painter, engraver, ceramicist, and architect, as well as a historian, journalist, and writer.

He was director of the Provincial Museum of Fine Arts Emilio Pettoruti.

Boveri died in his home in Manuel B. Gonnet on 17 February 1949.
