= Wilfrid James Hemp =

British archaeologist (1882–1962)

- Born: 27 April 1882; Richmond upon Thames, Surrey, England
- Died: 14 April 1962 (aged 79); Pwllheli, Caernarvonshire, Wales
- Occupations: Archaeologist; antiquarian

Wilfrid James Hemp, FSA (27 April 1882, Richmond upon Thames, Surrey – 14 April 1962, Pwllheli, Caernarvonshire) was an English archaeologist and antiquarian, an expert on medieval and pre-historic Wales.

Hemp was the only son of James Kennerley Hemp (born 1848 in Camberwell, London). He was educated at Highgate School from 1895 until 1902. He served in The Buffs in World War I. Elected a Fellow of the Society of Antiquaries in 1913, he was the first Inspector of Ancient Monuments for Wales, set up under the Ancient Monuments Consolidation and Amendment Act 1913, of which he was secretary until 1928, and thereafter until his death a member of the board. In 1928, he was appointed secretary of the Royal Commission on Ancient Monuments in Wales and Monmouthshire. He was primarily responsible for the Royal Commission's volume on Anglesey, "which set a new standard in the commission's inventories for the Principality". He married Dulcia Assheton, elder daughter of Richard Assheton, FRS, on 10 January 1934.
