= Pollença =

Pollença Pollensa
- Municipality
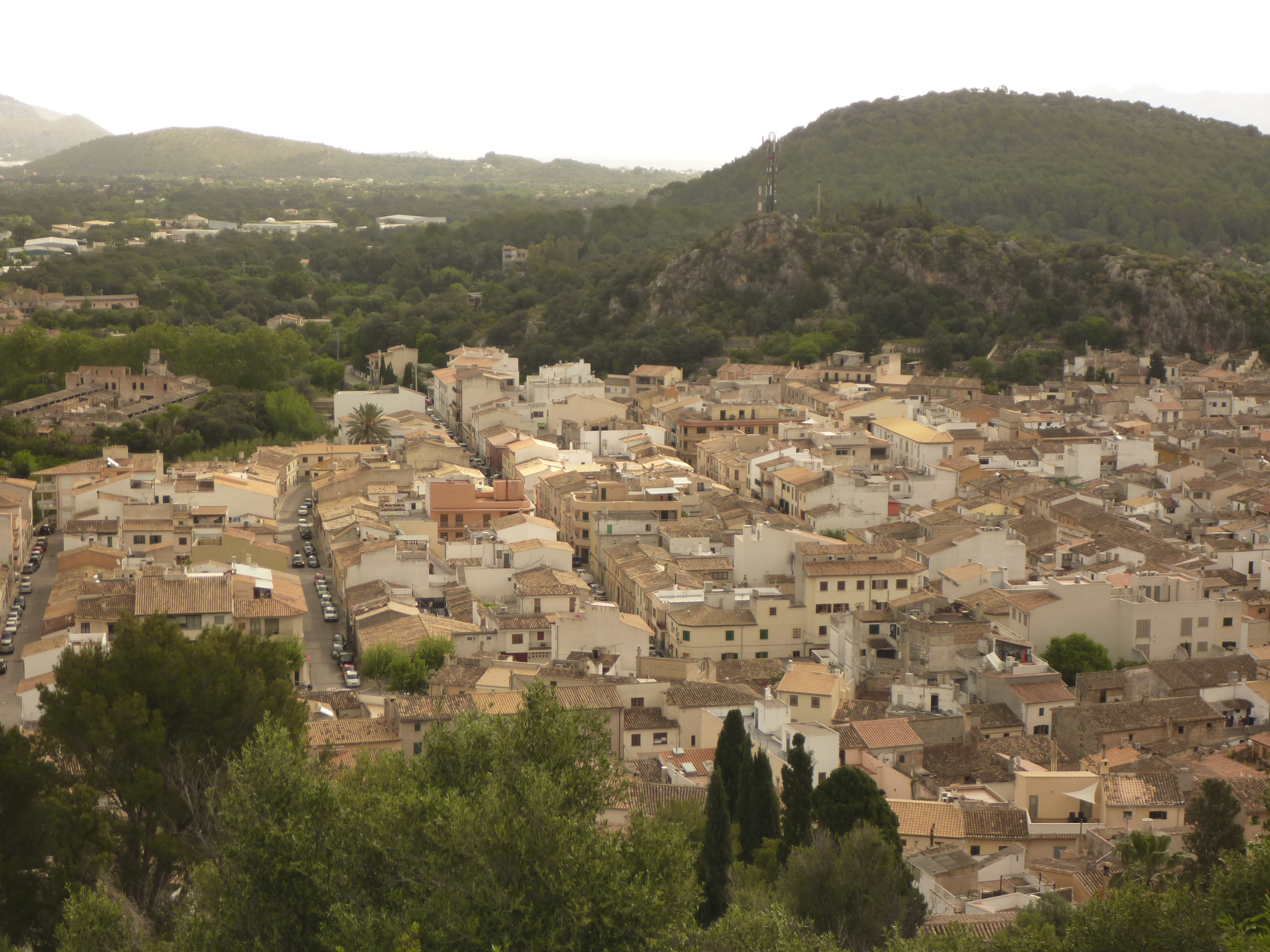

- Flag Coat of arms

- Location of Pollença in Mallorca

- Location in Mallorca Pollença (Balearic Islands) Pollença (Spain)
- Coordinates: 39°52′38″N 3°0′59″E
- Country: Spain
- Autonomous community: Balearic Islands
- Province: Balearic Islands
- Comarca: Sierra de Tramontana
- Judicial district: Inca

Government
  - Mayor: Martí March (PSOE; 2023)

Area
  - Total: 151.65 km^{2} (58.55 sq mi)
- Elevation: 47 m (154 ft)

Population (2025-01-01)
  - Total: 17,807
  - Density: 117.42/km^{2} (304.12/sq mi)
- Time zone: UTC+1 (CET)
  - Summer (DST): UTC+2 (CEST)
- Postal code: 07460

The 365 Calvari steps

Pollença (Balearic Catalan pronunciation: [poˈʎɛnsə]) or Pollensa, is a town and municipality in the northern part of the island of Mallorca, near Cap de Formentor and Alcúdia. It lies inland, about 6 km (4 mi) west of its port, Port de Pollença.

== History ==
The origin of the name "Pollença" can be traced back to the name of the Roman settlement of Pollentia, the excavated remains of which lie several kilometers away, at the modern municipality of Alcúdia. The displacement of the toponym is due to the fact that, during Late Antiquity, the city of Pollentia became depopulated, but the name remained to designate the region. In the Islamic period, the capital of the district, called Bullansa, was located in the place where, centuries later, the town of Pollença would be founded.

Throughout its history, Pollença was a site of significant military confrontations, due to its prominent geographical position, some 6 km (4 mi) from the coast, in an effort to avoid pirate attacks. It witnessed the battles of the Christian conquest and the expedition of King James I of Aragon, and also became the last stand of King James III of Majorca.

After the Conquest of Majorca, the Order of the Temple and other magnates acquired lands in Pollença, which later passed to the Order of Saint John in 1312. The population grew rapidly until the Black Plague of 1349. Pollença was a key site in military conflicts, such as the Christian conquest and the struggles between the kings of Mallorca and Aragon. During the Revolt of the Brotherhoods, Pollença aligned with the rebels, but in 1522 it was brutally suppressed by the royal army on the day known as the "Day of the Devastation."

During the 15th and 16th centuries, Pollença also had to face pirate attacks. In 1534, the people of Pollença repelled a landing in Formentor; in 1537, they ambushed a group of Saracen corsairs who had disembarked at Cala Estremer. However, the events of 1550 stand out, when the Turkish corsair Dragut occupied the town with 1,500 men. The people of Pollença, led by Joan Mas, confronted them and managed to force them to re-embark, though they lost more than thirty captives in the process. The bravery of Joan Mas and the other fighters contrasted with the negligence of the watchtower guards, the castle keeper, and the captain of arms, Pere Brull, who was punished with banishment from the town. These events are commemorated every 2nd of August during the town's patronal festivals with a reenactment of the battle between Moros i Cristians.

== Main sights ==
Most houses were built in the 17th and 18th centuries and many streets are very narrow and compact, a legacy from the medieval era. The central square, called Plaça Major, has numerous outdoor cafés and is dominated by a large 13th-century church Esglèsia de Nostra Senyora dels Àngels (Our Lady of the Angels) which was built by the Order of the Temple.

One of the town's most distinctive features is the 365-step stairway north of the square; this leads up to a chapel on top of the hill known as Calvary. On Good Friday this is the setting for the most dramatic parade of the year. First, on the road winding up the back of the hill, there is a reenactment of the Stations of the Cross. This is followed by a mock crucifixion on top of the hill after which the figure of Christ is ceremonially removed from the Cross. There is a sombre, torchlit parading of the body of Christ through the town led by hundreds of people in cloaks, masks and pointed hats and done in total silence save for the slow beating of a drum.

The town also has a 19th-century bridge of Romanesque design that crosses a stream to the north of town.

Most visited sights in Pollença town: Plaça Mayor, Plaça Vella, Can Llobera, Convent, Joan March Gardens, Calvari and Roman Bridge.

== Beaches ==
- Cala Figuera
- Cala Murta
- Cala Formentor
- Cala Sant Vicenç (Cala Molins, Cala Barques, Cala Clara and Cala Carbó)
- Cala Boquer
- Port de Pollença Beach
- Llenaire Beach
- Can Cuarassa Beach
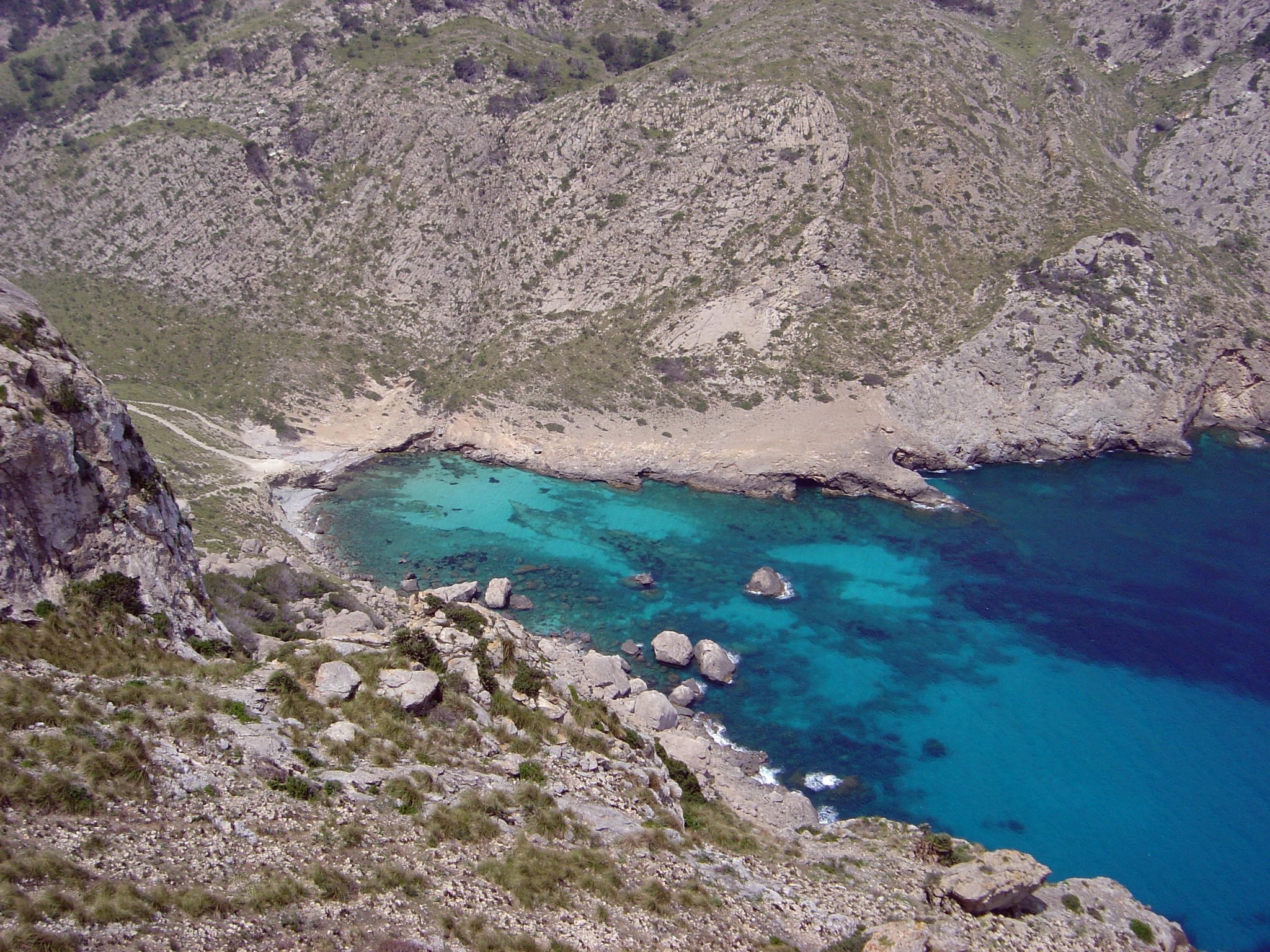
Cala Figuera.

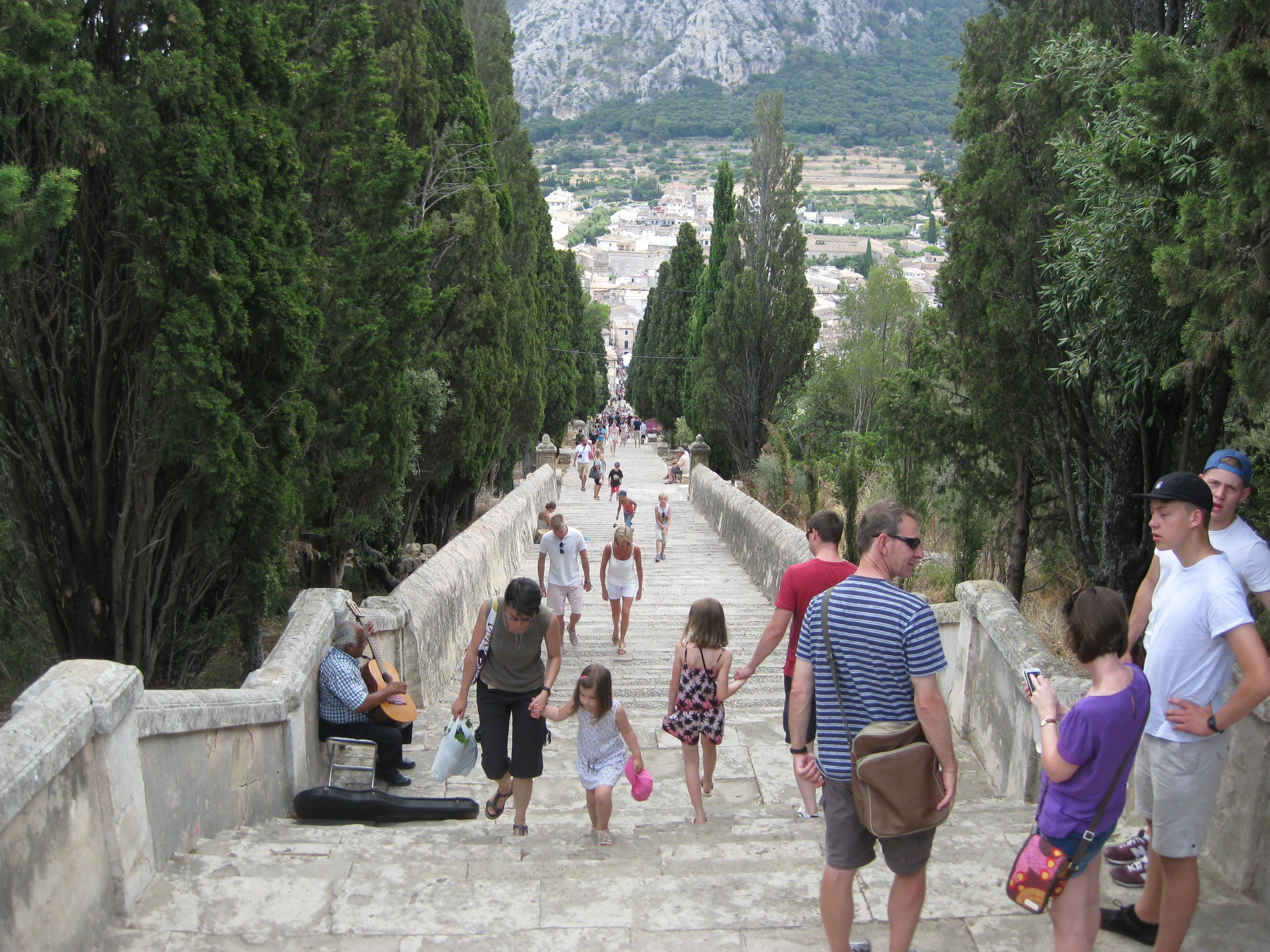
View from the top of the 365 Calvari Steps

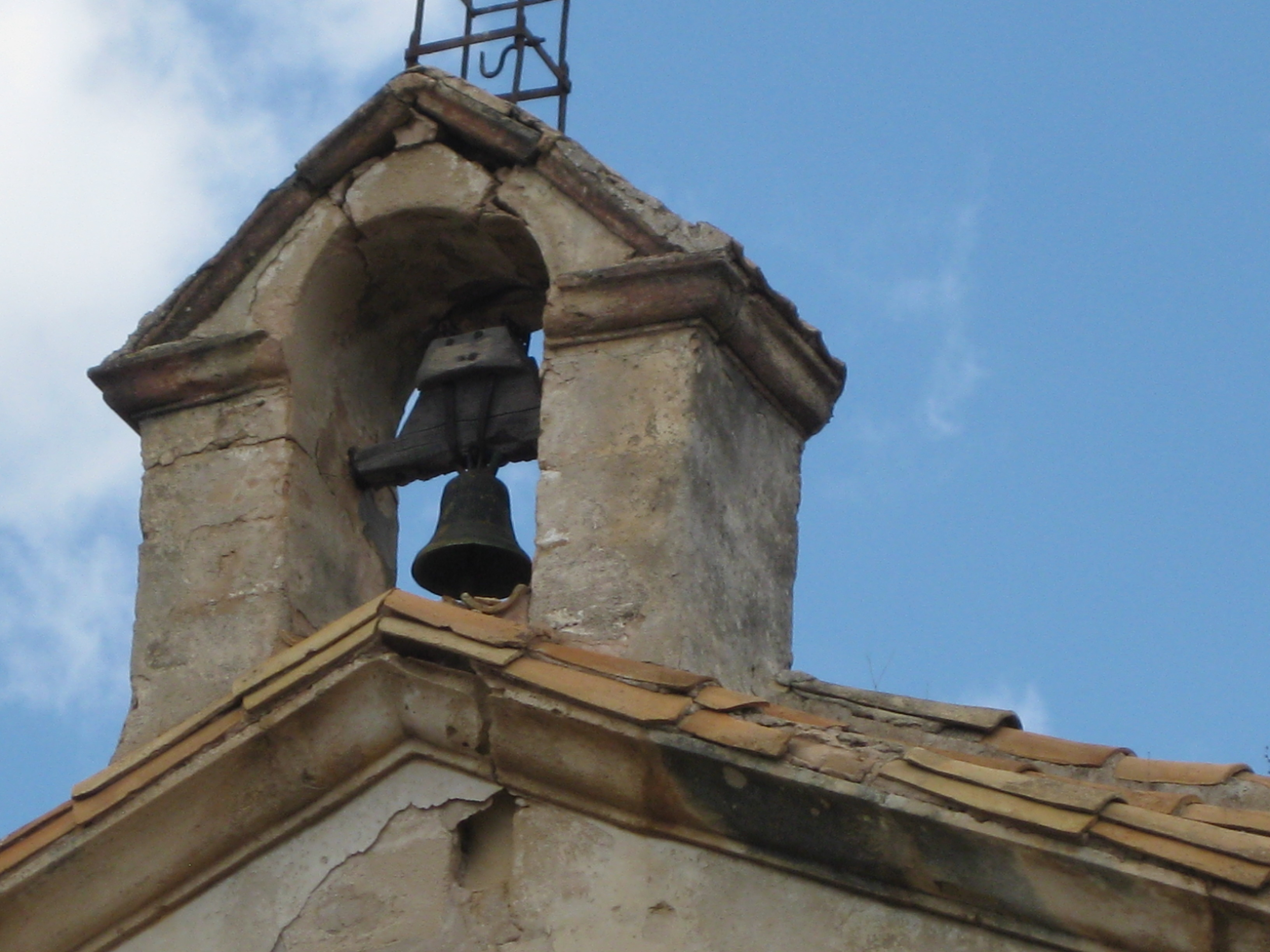
At the top of the 365 Calvari Steps is this church
