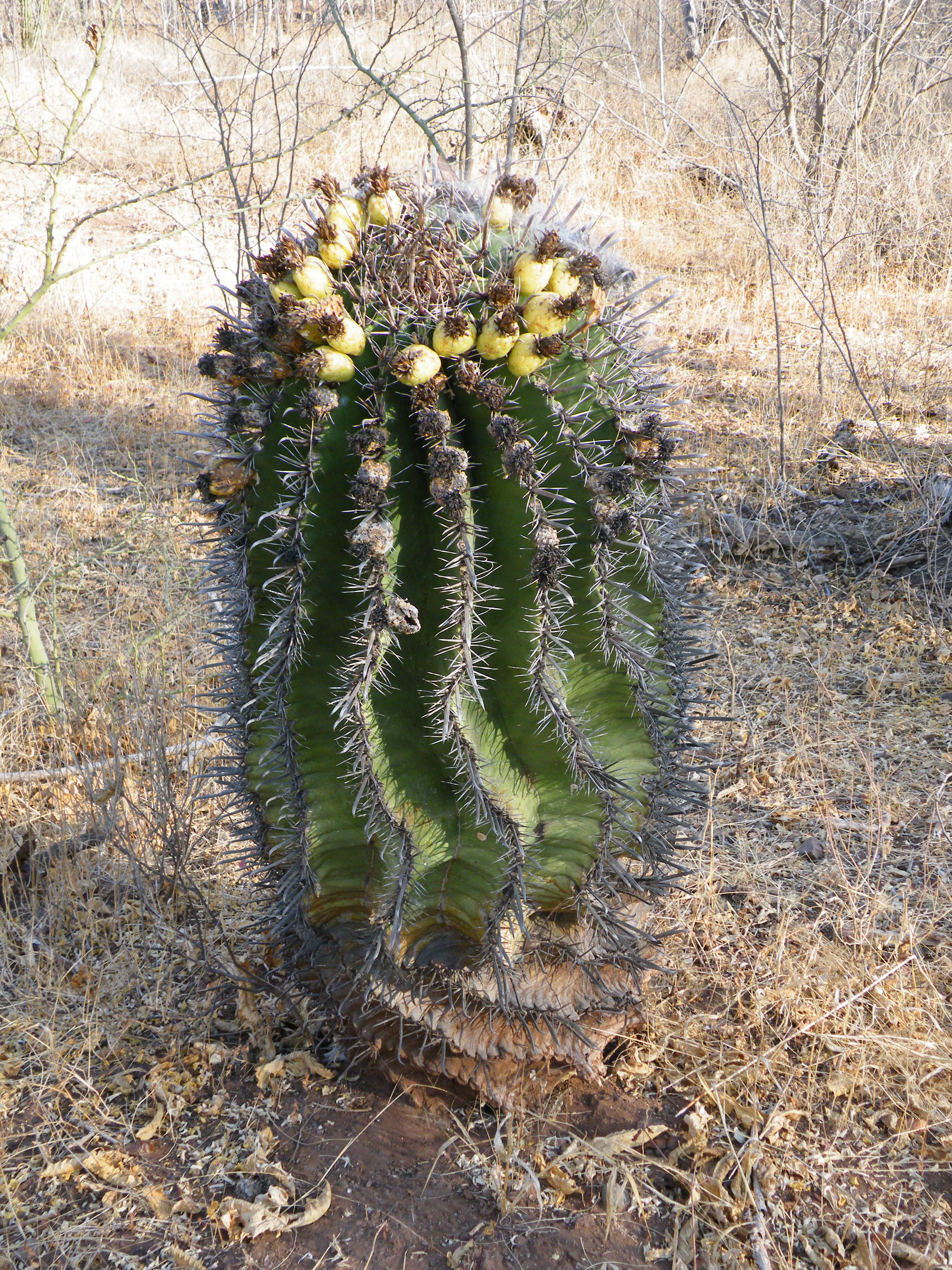
- In Guamúchil, Sinaloa, Mexico
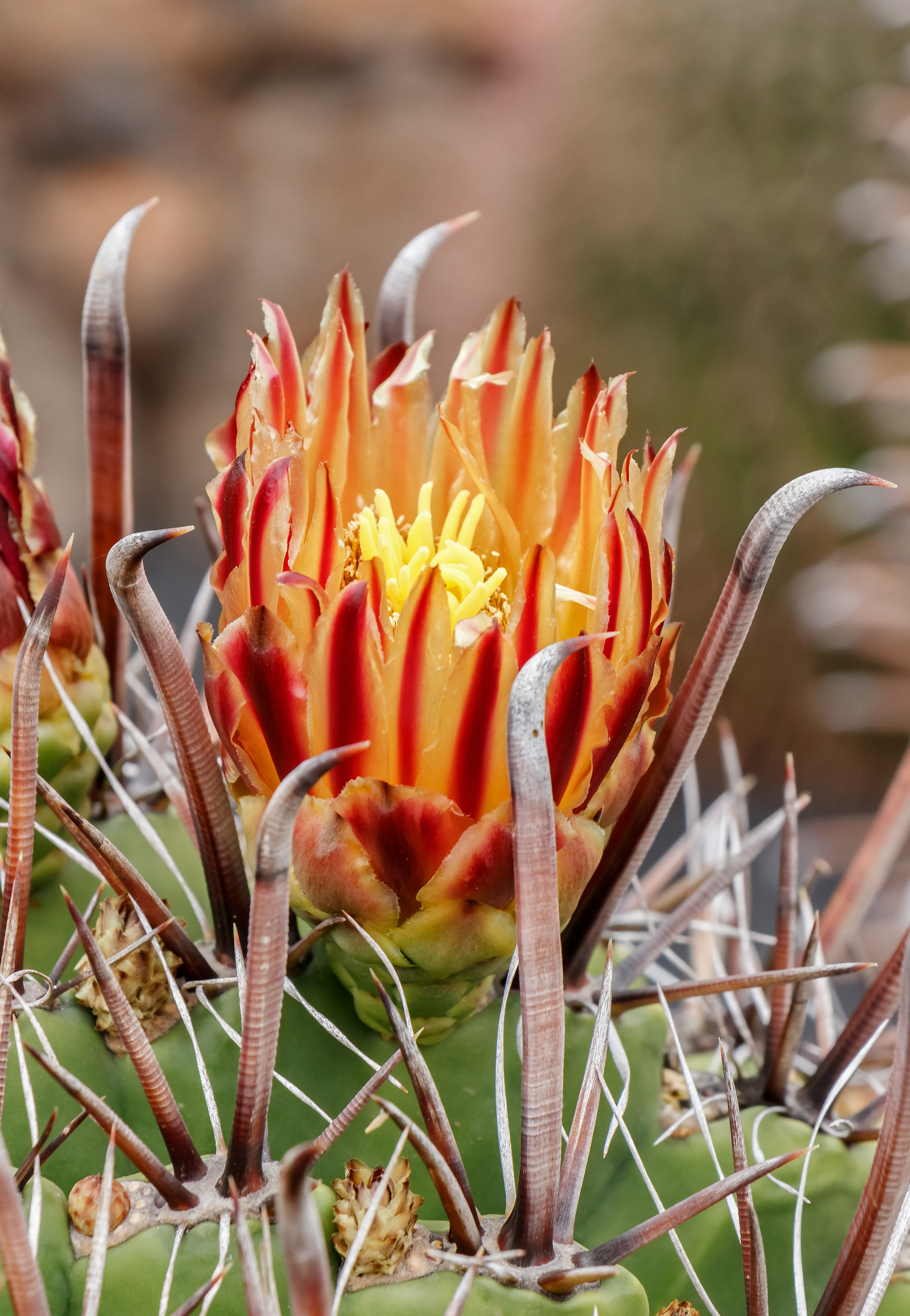
- Flower details

Conservation status
- Vulnerable (IUCN 3.1)
- CITES Appendix II

Scientific classification
- Kingdom: Plantae
- Clade: Tracheophytes
- Clade: Angiosperms
- Clade: Eudicots
- Order: Caryophyllales
- Family: Cactaceae
- Subfamily: Cactoideae
- Genus: Ferocactus
- Species: F. herrerae

Binomial name
- Ferocactus herrerae J.G.Ortega, 1927

Synonyms
- Ferocactus wislizeni subsp. herrerae Pilbeam & Bowdery, 2005; Ferocactus wislizeni var. herrerae N.P.Taylor, 1984

= Ferocactus herrerae =

Species of cactus

Ferocactus herrerae, commonly known as the twisted barrel cactus, Herrera's barrel cactus, or the biznaga (in Classical Nahuatl), is a species of viviparous barrel cactus in the genus Ferocactus of the family Cactaceae that is native to southwestern Sonora to the northwestern coastline of Sinaloa in western Mexico.

== Description ==
F. herrerae is a solitary cactus, reaching an average height of 2 m (6.56 ft), and 40 cm (15.74 in) in diameter. It features 13 deep ribs, initially heavily tuberculated. Areoles are 2.03 cm long with 7-9 spines, with supposed bristle-like radials up to 10 cm (3.9 in) long and 5 mm (0.20 in) wide. Flowers are yellow, with red-pink midribs and brown tips, blooming from Summer to early Autumn. The funnel-shaped flowers are yellow with a red central stripe, reaching up to 6 cm (2.4 in) in length and diameter. Fruit are yellow-green and fleshy, 4 to 6 cm (1.6 to 2.4 in) long, and 2.5 to 3 cm (0.98 to 1.18 in) in diameter, splitting open at their base. It starts out in a globular barrel cactus form and eventually, as it matures, developing into a signature cylindrical barrel cactus form.

== Taxonomy ==
It was described by Mexican botanist, Jesús González Ortega in 1927. Its common name refers to its twisted, barrel cactus shape habit, with long, hooked, or barbed spines. Ferocactus herrerae was originally listed as a subspecies or variety of Ferocactus wislizeni until it was elevated to full species status based on morphological differences. The prior treatment is still used by some authors.

== Distribution and habitat ==
Ferocactus herrerae is native to portions of coastal southwestern Sonora to the northwestern coastline of Sinaloa in western Mexico, at elevations of under 400 m in coastal plains or semi-arid to arid shrubland. Its range is sometimes said to extend into extreme western Durango.

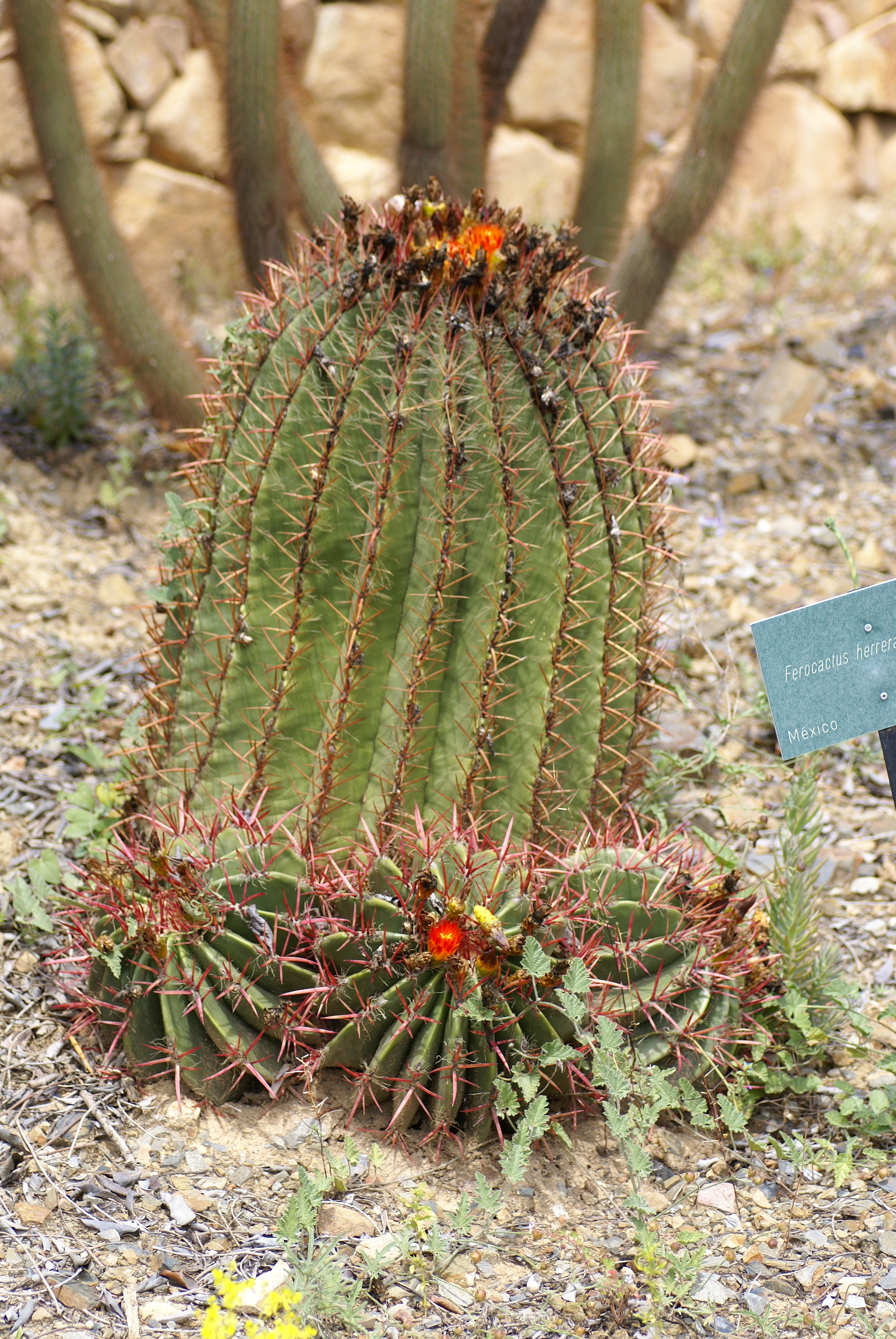
In Jardín Botánico La Concepción, Malaga, Andalusia, Spain, showing off offspring or pups

== Conservation ==
Ferocactus herrerae was assessed and listed as "Vulnerable" by the IUCN Red List (International Union for Conservation of Nature), for agricultural land clearance and conversion, combined with shrimp farming practices have greatly limited populations. Its current population is decreasing at a rate of 30%. It may also be provided a source of protection from CITES Appendix II, though this cannot be certain.

== Uses ==
Ferocactus herrerae is commonly used as an ornamental cactus out of its native range. Its seeds can be ground into flour, and its fruit are edible, showing numerous positive nutritional aspects.

== Ecology ==
Ferocactus herrerae is commonly pollinated by various cactus bee species (Lithurgus spp.).

== Gallery ==
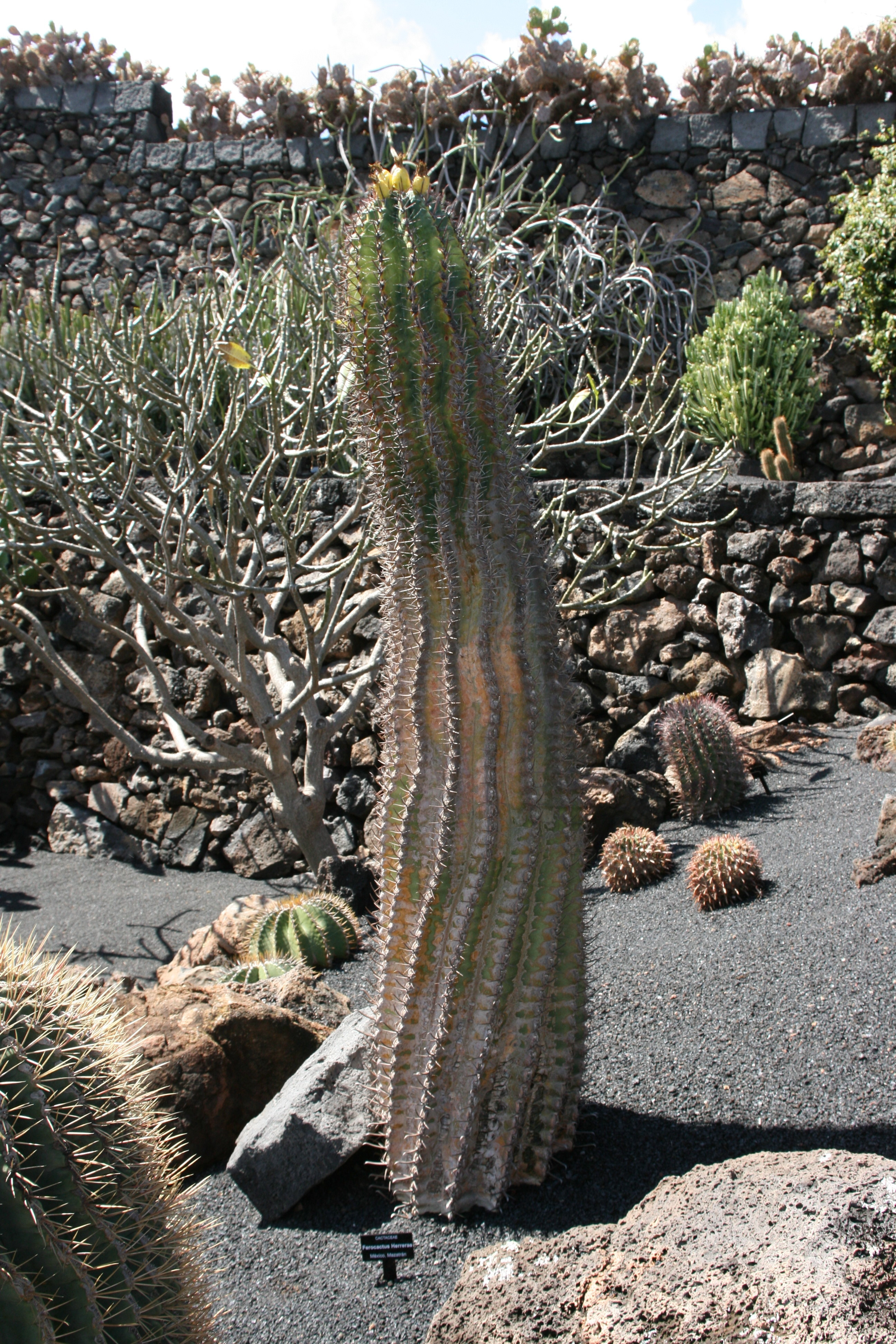
In Jardín de Cactus, Guatiza, Lanzarote, Canary Islands, Spain

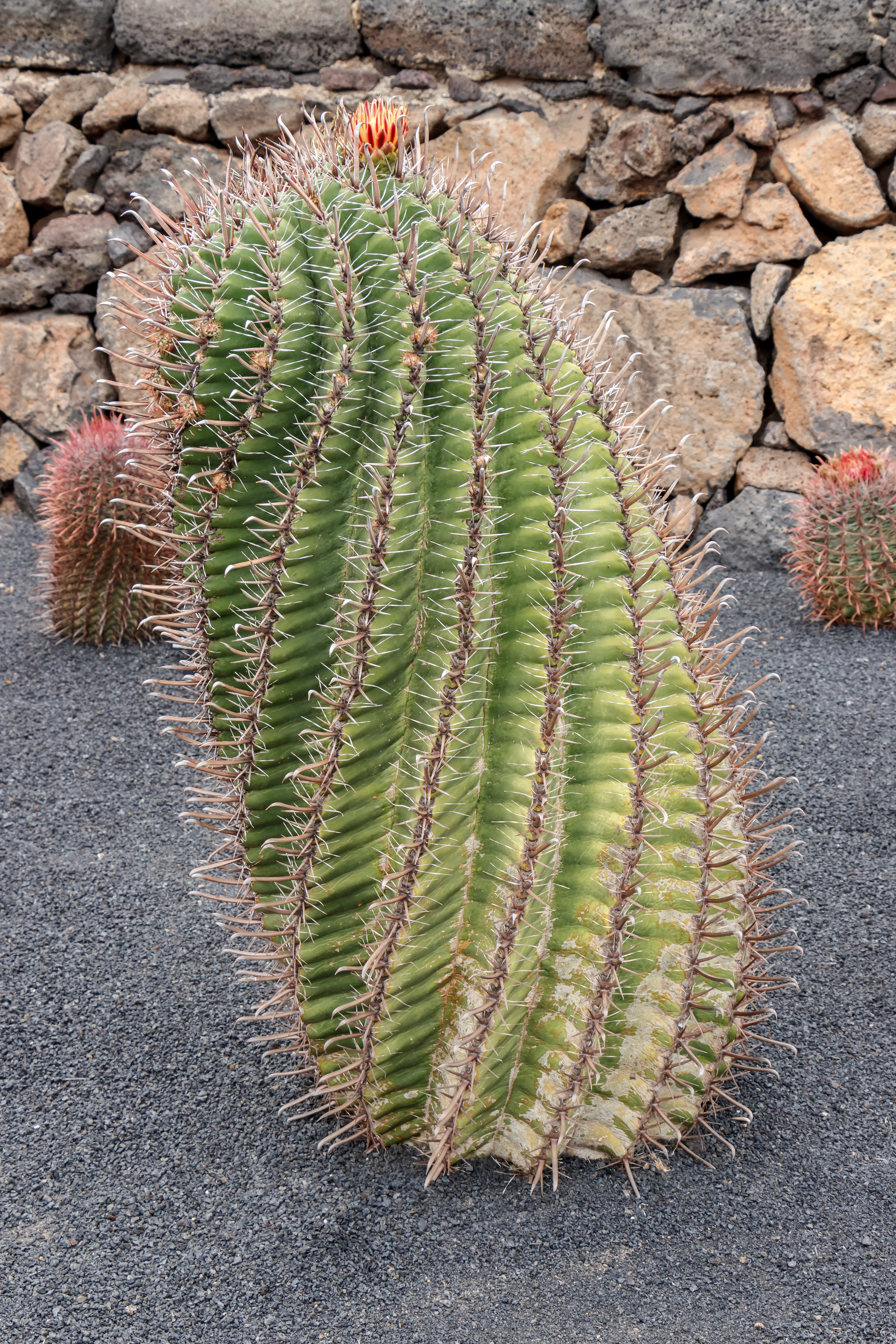
In Jardín de Cactus, Guatiza, Lanzarote, Canary Islands, Spain

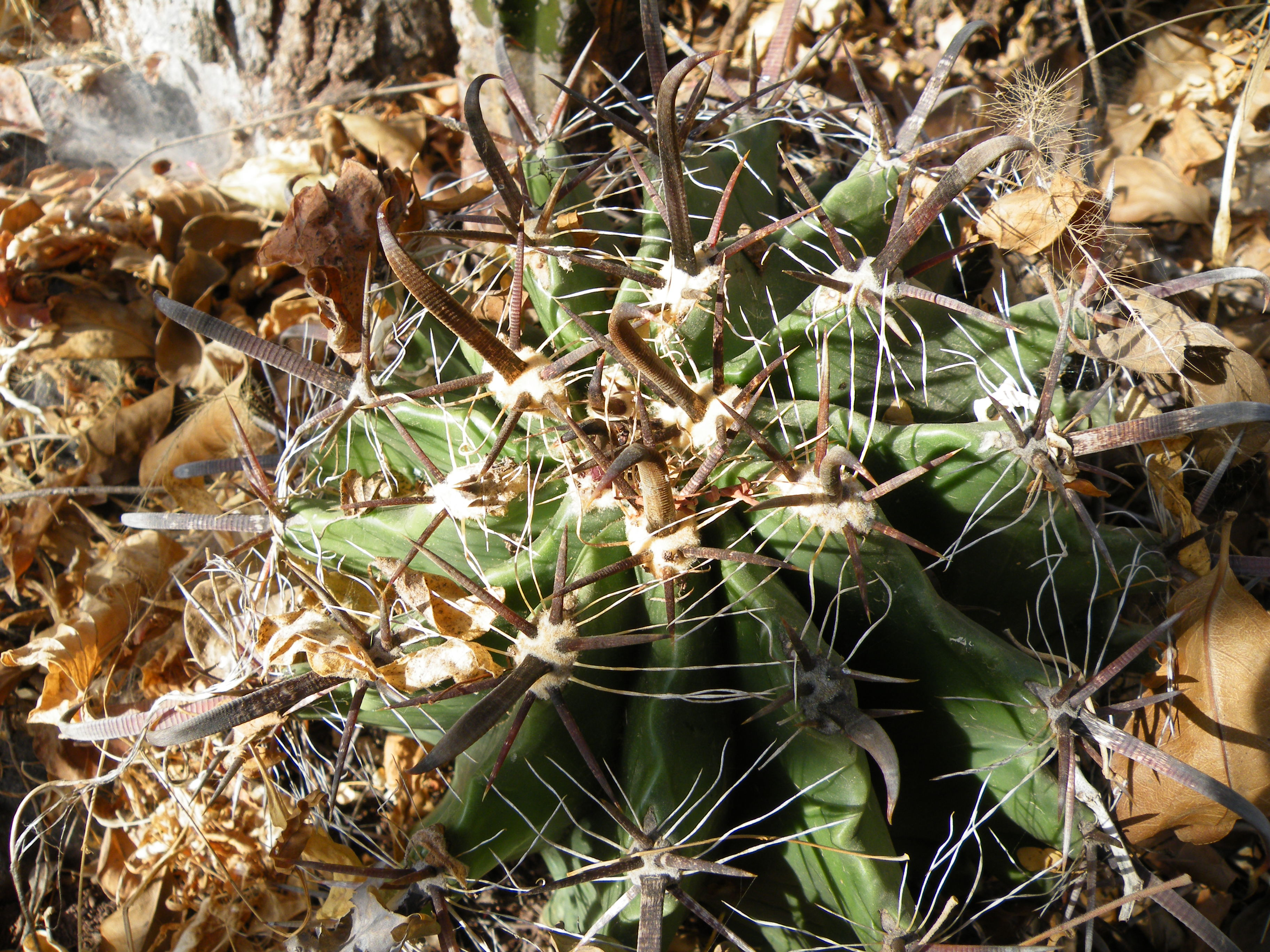
In Guamúchil, Sinaloa, Mexico

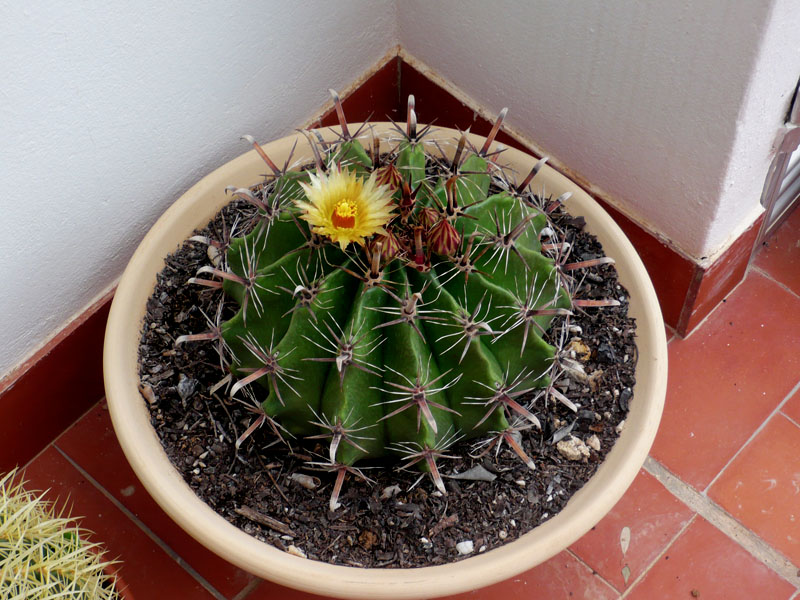
As an ornamental cactus

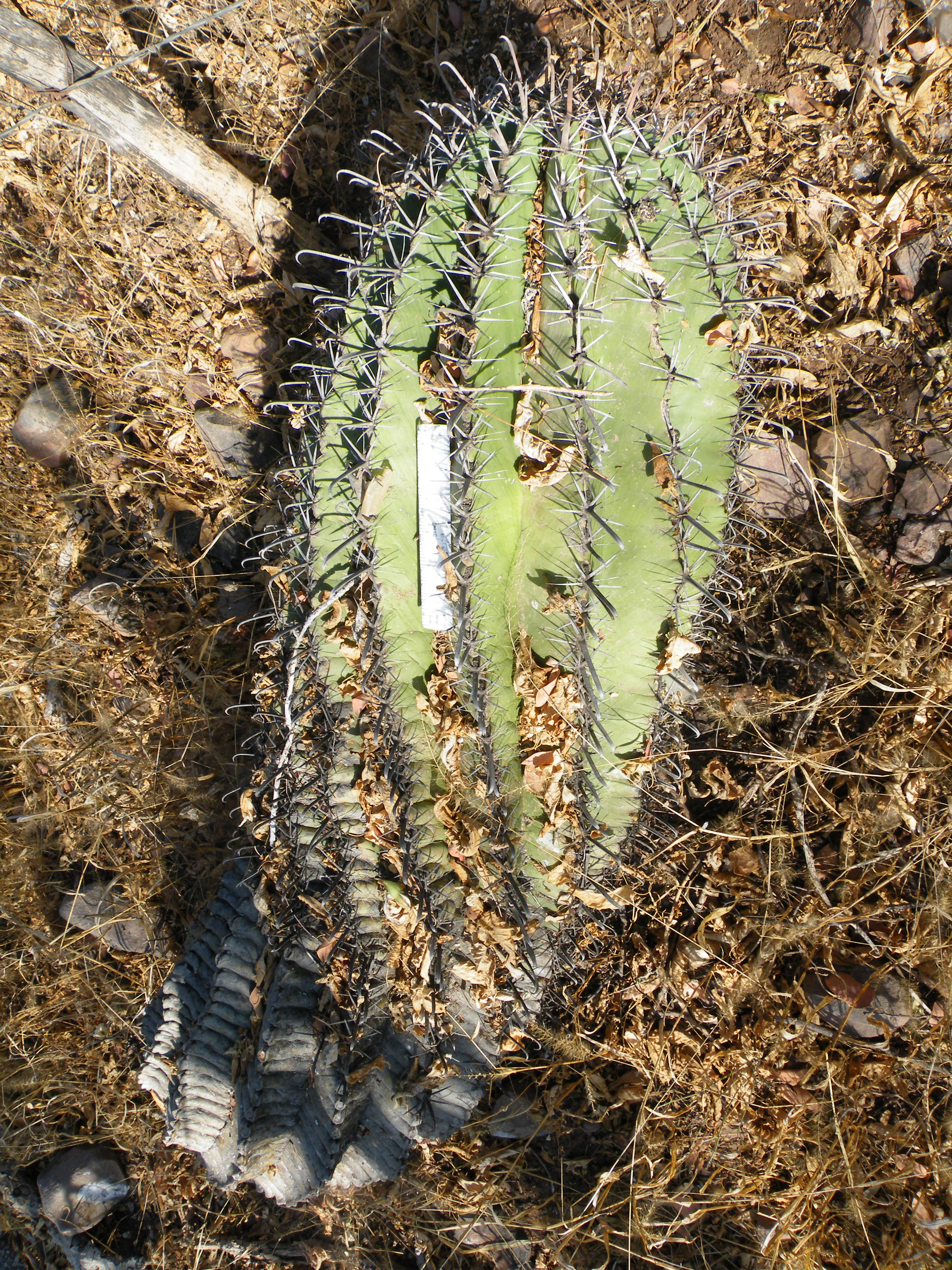
Detached or curved individual in Guamúchil, Sinaloa, Mexico
