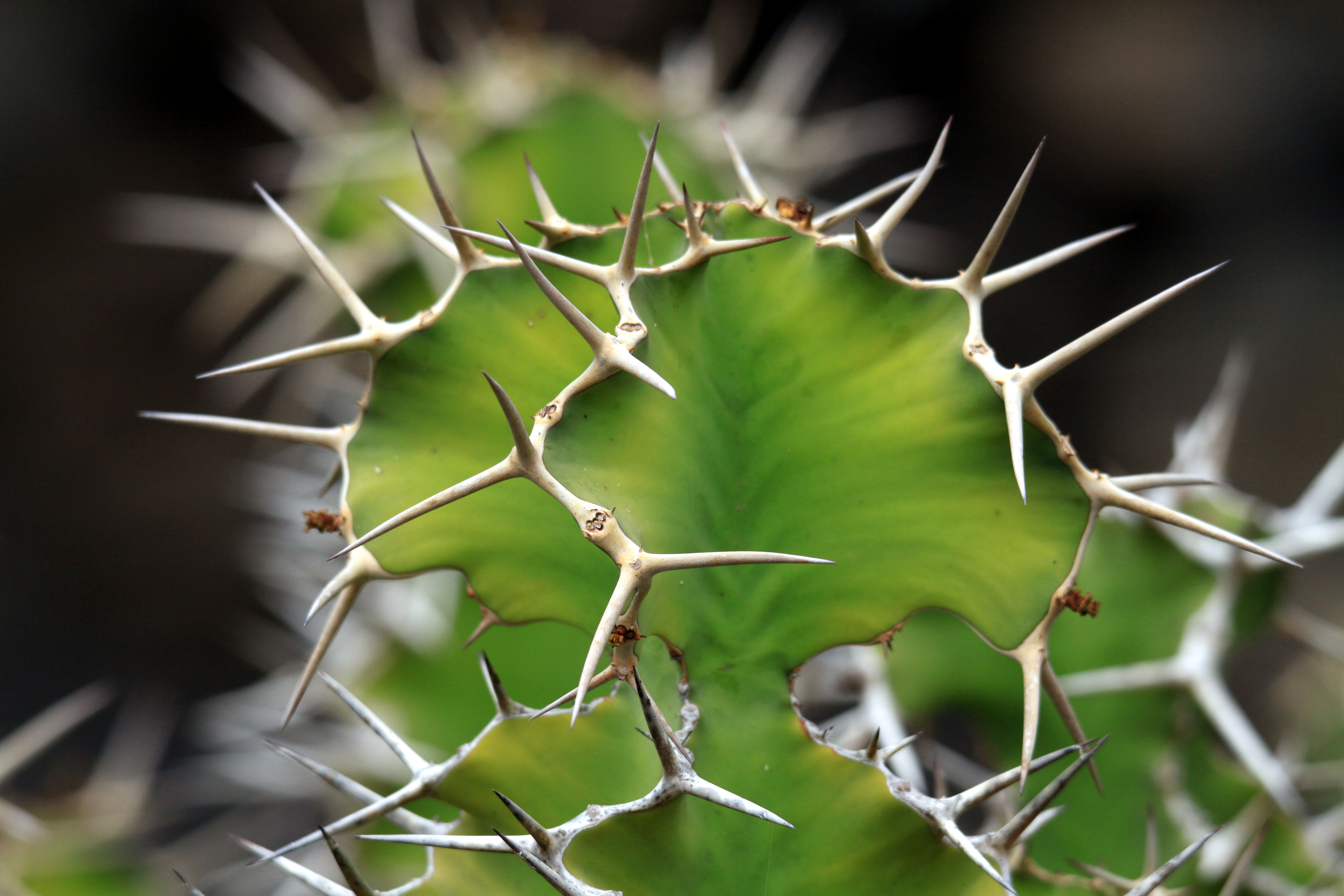
- Euphorbia grandicornis in the Jardín de Cactus in Guatiza on Lanzarote in the Canary Islands

Conservation status
- Least Concern (IUCN 3.1)

Scientific classification
- Kingdom: Plantae
- Clade: Tracheophytes
- Clade: Angiosperms
- Clade: Eudicots
- Clade: Rosids
- Order: Malpighiales
- Family: Euphorbiaceae
- Genus: Euphorbia
- Species: E. grandicornis

Binomial name
- Euphorbia grandicornis Blanc (1888)

Subspecies
- Euphorbia grandicornis subsp. grandicornis; Euphorbia grandicornis subsp. sejuncta L.C.Leach

Synonyms
- synonyms of E. grandicornis subsp. grandicornis: Euphorbia grandialata R.A.Dyer (1937); Euphorbia grandidens K.I.Goebel (1889), sphalm.

= Euphorbia grandicornis =

Species of plant

Euphorbia grandicornis, the cow's horn plant, is a succulent plant of the Euphorbiaceae or spurge family. It is native to the KwaZulu-Natal province and the Northern Provinces of South Africa and to Mozambique and Eswatini.

The specific epithet "grandicornis" means "with large horns," and refers to the pairs of spines, which look like the horns of a bull.

== Description ==
Euphorbia grandicornis is a shrub with succulent, spiny stems that reaches a size of 0.5–2 m in height. Small leaves are formed between the spines but later drop off; the stems do the bulk of the photosynthesis. It is much branched from the base, with thorns, the branches 3-angled, erect or ascending, very deeply constricted in segments, subsagittate-ovate or reniform-sagittate, 5–13 cm long and 5 – 15 cm in diameter.

The fruit is showy and pops open when ripe.

It is found in dense dry mixed forest, on granite slopes, and on rocks, at elevations of 40 to 700 meters.

== Subspecies ==
Two subspecies are accepted:

- Euphorbia grandicornis subsp. grandicornis – Mozambique, Eswatini, Northern Provinces, and KwaZulu-Natal
- Euphorbia grandicornis subsp. sejuncta L.C.Leach – north-central Mozambique

== Uses ==
It is grown as a houseplant in temperate regions.

Chemical constituents of E. grandicornis have been studied for their use in cancer treatment.
