= Carlos Barral =

Spanish poet (1928–1989)

Carlos Barral i Agesta (1928–1989) was a Spanish poet, considered (along with Jaime Gil de Biedma) to be one of the greatest poets of the so-called generation of the 1950s. He helped to establish the Formentor Group and their literary awards the Prix Formentor and the Prix International. He was also a member of the European Parliament and an important publisher.

== Biography ==
Carlos Barral was born in Barcelona, Spain. In 1957, he joined Víctor Seix in the management of the publishing house Seix Barral, which had been founded by his parents in 1911, and which became the most prestigious publishing house in the 1960s and thereafter.

Looking for a way to further open up Spanish literature Markets, Barral organised, through the Seix Barral, a series of annual meetings of publishers, novelists and critics. These 'Coloquio Internacional de Novela' ('International Colloquium of the Novel') were held in Formentor on Mallorca, Spain between 1959 and 1962, paid for by international publishers. As a compromise between literary and commercial goals, two prizes were devised: the Prix International and the Prix Formentor, to be initiated in 1961. Prize winners included Borges, Beckett and Bellow.

Barral also participated in the launching and management of the publishing house Barral Editores in 1970.

Barral was a senator in the Socialists' Party of Catalonia-Spanish Socialist Workers' Party for Tarragona in 1982 and afterwards its European Parliament representative.

He is best known for his two poetry books, Metropolitano, 19 historias de mi guerra civil ("Metropolitan, 19 Stories of My Civil War") and Lecciones de cosas ("Lessons of Things"), but his three volumes of memoirs are also held in high esteem.

== Works ==
- Metropolitano (1957)
- Diecinueve figuras de mi historia civil (1961)
- Usuras (1965)
- Figuración y fuga (1966)
- Informe personal sobre el alba (1970)
- Usuras y figuraciones (1973)
- Años de penitencia (1975)
- Los años sin excusa (1978)
- Catalunya des del mar (1982)
- Catalunya a vol d'ocell (1985)
- Lecciones de cosas: Veinte poemas para el nieto Malcolm (1986)
- Cuando las horas veloces (1988)
- Antología poética (1989)
- Los diarios (1993, published posthumously)
