= Prix Formentor =

Spanish literary award

- Native name: Premio Formentor de las Letras
- Location: Formentor, Mallorca
- Country: Spain
- Website: https://www.fundacionformentor.com/

The Prix Formentor (also known as Premio Formentor de las Letras, Formentor Literature Prize and the Formentor Prize) is an international literary award given between 1961 and 1967, and, after a long break, from 2011. In the 1960s, the Formentor Group offered two prizes, the Prix Formentor (the Formentor Prize) and the Prix International (the International Prize); the former was given to previously unpublished works and the Prix International was given to works already in distribution.

The prize takes its name from Formentor, located on the Spanish island of Mallorca that was famous for its literary gatherings, and classic works such as The Pine of Formentor. As of 2012, the award carries a cash prize of 50,000 euros ($65,000) given to a single author.

== History ==
The 1950s saw an increasing expansion of the global interest in Hispanic literature. Looking for a way to further open up Spanish literature markets, Carlos Barral organised, through the publishing house Seix Barral, a series of annual meetings of publishers, novelists and critics. These 'Coloquio Internacional de Novela' ('International Colloquium of the Novel') were held in Formentor on the island of Majorca, Spain between 1959 and 1962, and were paid for by international publishers. The first meeting happened directly after celebrations for the 'Conversaciones de Poéticas de Formentor' '(The Conversations of the Poets of Formentor') 18–25 May 1959, inspired by novelist Camilo José Cela, and brought together a wide variety of multilingual poets.

The first Barral Coloquio, which occurred 28–29 May 1959, focused on the political issues of the role of the novelist in societal change, specifically the new power of social realism, polarised by concerns to give primacy to technical form or political commitment.

The second Coloquio, 2–5 May 1960, shifted focus towards the role of the publisher as aesthetic pioneer versus commercial entrepreneur. Prominent publishing houses from the US, Italy, the UK, France and Germany, as well as Spain, were present. It was at this Coloquio that the Formentor Group was formally founded. The group operated between 1960 and 1968, and dedicated to the dissemination of the contemporary literary avant garde; they were joined during this time by publishers from an array of nations, including Japan, Denmark and Holland. It was during this second annual gathering that the participants were tasked with formulating an international prize that would be awarded the following year.

The group's initial idea was to award a “Prix International de Editeurs”, given to authors not widely known beyond their national bounds. It was to be given to avant garde works already published. The group hoped to take control of the market for Western high-brow literature. Co-founder Giulio Einaudi stated that the group, working with all major European publishers, was strategically placed to have a monopoly on "priceless information that would place them in the forefront of all narratives". Combined, they hoped to gain unrivalled access to all literary creation and criticism. Barral intended that the judging would be a symposium for lectures and debates held publicly in the presence of journalists, as it was.

Instead of one prize, as a compromise between literary and commercial goals, two prizes were devised, both to be initiated in 1961. The Prix International was judged by a team of literary specialists and writers who assessed quality, in a process similar in structure to the judging of the Nobel Prize. The Prix Formentor was awarded by publishers, who participated in a secret vote at a closed session. Critics such Santana and Pavlović (Mario Santana and Miodrag Pavlović?) point to the clash within the Formentor group and between the two prizes presenting essentially different concerns: art versus the market; the cultural versus the economic; Madrid, as a literary/political centre versus Barcelona, an economic nexus; leftist priorities versus more centrist financial interests. Mayder Dravasa also points to clear divisions between publishers from Latin versus Anglophone cultures and also between Spain versus Latin America, whose 'colonialist' literature (see postcolonial literature) was held as somewhat parochial.

== Awards ==
=== 1961–1967 ===
During the third Coloquio, in 1961, the two prizes were awarded in the tense atmosphere of a political summit. The Prix International, for literary prestige, was given jointly to Irish playwright Samuel Beckett and Argentine poet and short story writer Jorge Luis Borges. Max Frisch (Swiss), Henry Miller (American) and Alejo Carpentier (Cuban) had made it to that shortlist. It was the first major recognition of an Argentine writer and Borges commented "as a consequence of that prize, my books mushroomed overnight, throughout the western world." The other prize, the Prix Formentor, was created for a novel already in print with one of the group's publishers, a work that would commercially benefit from international translation and dissemination in 14 countries. The prize in that first year went to Spanish writer Juan Garcia Hortelano for his novel Tormenta de Verano (Summer Storm). The translations of the book were badly received by European critics and looked to mark the end of the prize. The novel went unnoticed outside Spain.

Franco condemned the awards as intellectual dissidence against his regime and banned a repetition on Spanish territory. The prize giving was moved to Corfu (1963), Salzburg (Austria, 1964), Valescure (Southern France, 1965) and Gammarth (Tunisia, 1966). The Coloquios and the prize giving procedures were complex and expensive, paid for by the publishers. The decisions became increasingly politicised and factionalised, prompting the publishing houses to lose interest in backing the project. The last prize of the 1960s was given in 1967.

=== 2011–present ===
The prize was resurrected in 2011, given to one author only with a cash award of 50,000 euros ($65,000). In 2011 the prize was given to Carlos Fuentes. In 2012 it went to Juan Goytisolo; the jury expressed "admiration for the strength, example and independent judgement of a writer whose literary work belongs to the great narrative tradition of the Spanish language."

== Winners ==
=== Prix Formentor ===
- 1961: Juan García Hortelano, Tormenta de verano (Summer Storm)
- 1962: Dacia Maraini, L'età del malessere (The Age of Malaise)
- 1963: Jorge Semprún, Le Grand Voyage
- 1964: Gisela Elsner, Die Riesenzwerge (The Giant Dwarfs)
- 1965: Stephen Schneck, The Nightclerk
- 1966: cancelled
- 1967: unassigned

==== After reinstatement ====
- 2011: Carlos Fuentes
- 2012: Juan Goytisolo
- 2013: Javier Marías
- 2014: Enrique Vila-Matas
- 2015: Ricardo Piglia
- 2016: Roberto Calasso
- 2017: Alberto Manguel
- 2018: Mircea Cărtărescu
- 2019: Annie Ernaux
- 2020: Cees Nooteboom
- 2021: César Aira
- 2022: Lyudmila Ulitskaya
- 2023: Pascal Quignard
- 2024: László Krasznahorkai
- 2025: Hélène Cixous
- 2026: Gonçalo M. Tavares

=== Prix International ===
- 1961: Jorge Luis Borges Ficciones (Fictions) & Samuel Beckett (Trilogy)
- 1962: Uwe Johnson Mutmassungen über Jakob (Speculations about Jakob)
- 1963: Carlo Emilio Gadda La cognizione del dolore (Acquainted with Grief)
- 1964: Nathalie Sarraute Les Fruits d'or (Golden Fruits)
- 1965: Saul Bellow Herzog
- 1966: No prize awarded
- 1967: Witold Gombrowicz Kosmos (Cosmos)
