= Desert City =

Plant nursery in Spain

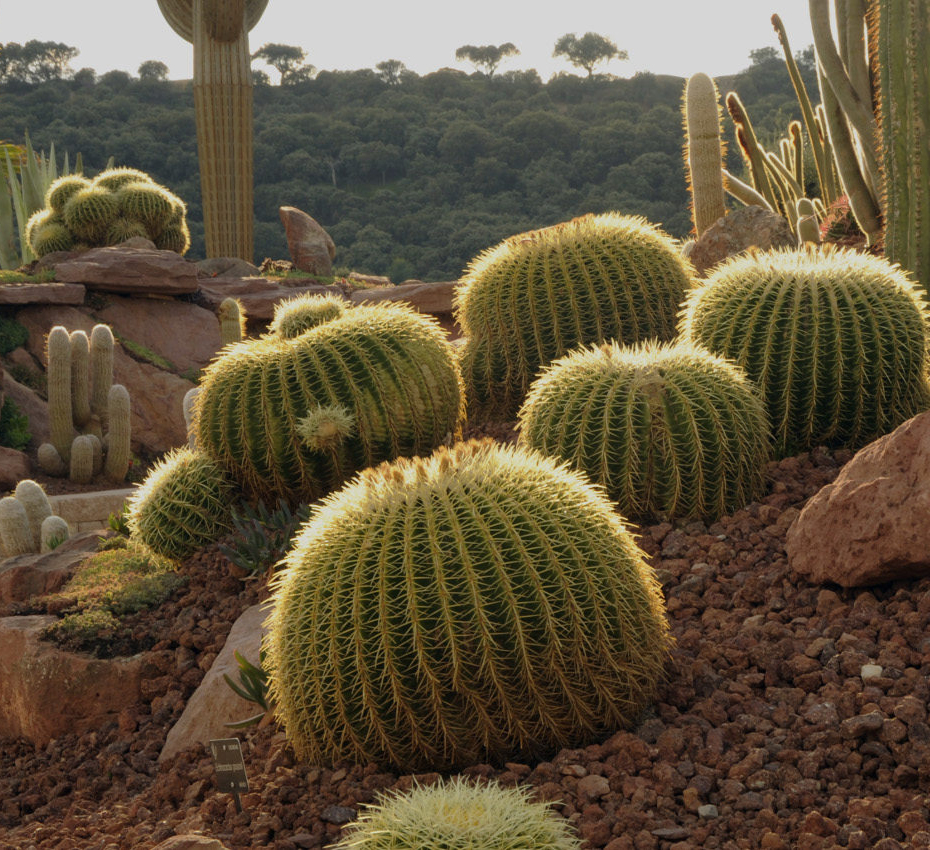
- Echinocactus grusonii

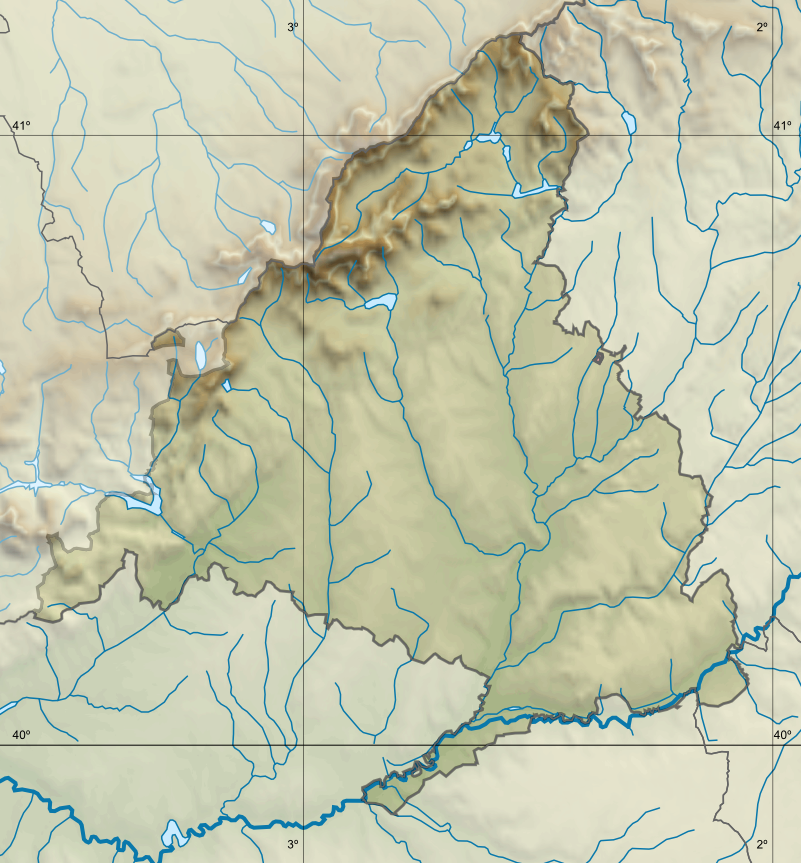
- Location within Community of Madrid Location within Spain
- Type: Botanical garden
- Location: San Sebastián de los Reyes, Community of Madrid Spain.
- Nearest town: Fuente del Fresno, Madrid
- Coordinates: 40°35′56″N 3°34′56.6″W
- Area: 16,000 metres (52,000 ft) nursery and 6,000 metres (20,000 ft) botanical garden
- Created: April 28, 2017
- Owner: private
- Operator: private
- Status: Open all year
- Website: desertcity.es

Desert City is a plant nursery and botanical garden in San Sebastián de los Reyes, near Madrid, Spain, that cultivates and sells xerophytic plants, including cacti, succulents and native plants from the Mediterranean region. It is Europe's largest cactus garden. Desert City was founded by Jacobo García-Germán, an architect, and Mercedes García, a former pharmaceuticals executive.

== Plant Nursery ==
The biotechnological nursery specializes in xeriscaping and research and cultivation of cacti and other xerophytic plants.

== Botanical Garden ==
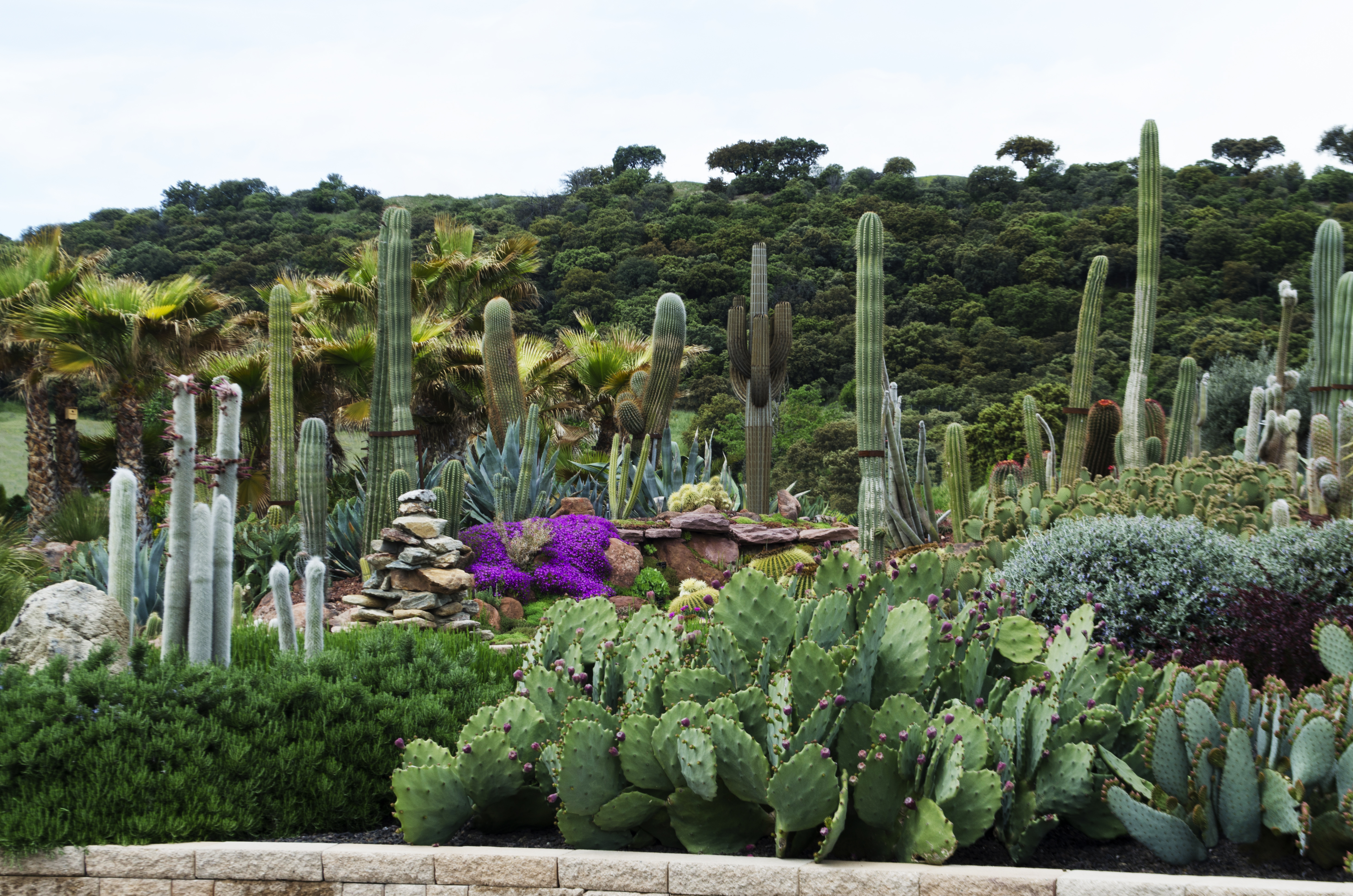

The garden has a size of 6,000 square metres (65,000 sq ft) and combines plants of the natural landscapes of the arid and semi-arid areas of the planet (such as cacti), with native plants from the Mediterranean climate, like lavender, rosemary and others. Its collection includes over 600 species, ranging in size from plants such as the Blossfeldia liliputana (12–16 millimetres (0.47–0.63 in) high) to the Saguaro (50 feet (15 m) high).

The garden is divided into 5 main thematic areas:

- Arizona. Garden with cacti of various shapes, colors and textures.
- Oasis. Contains a palm forest with a bird nesting environment and a waterfall.
- Taverns
- Tuscany. A reinterpretation of the Italian stately garden. In this space, species associated with Italy, such as olive, pomegranate, myrtle, tamarix or lavender, are mixed with others of Mexican origin such as yuccas, dasylirions, opuntias, agaves as well as many other species of varied origins.
- Guajira. Cacti, xerophytic Mediterranean species and plants popular in classic gardening.

== See also ==
- Xeriscaping
- Rainfed agriculture
- Mossèn Costa i Llobera Gardens
- Jardín de Cactus
