= Mossèn Costa i Llobera Gardens =

Botanical garden in the center of Barcelona, Catalonia, Spain

Coordinates: 41.3689°N 2.1723°E

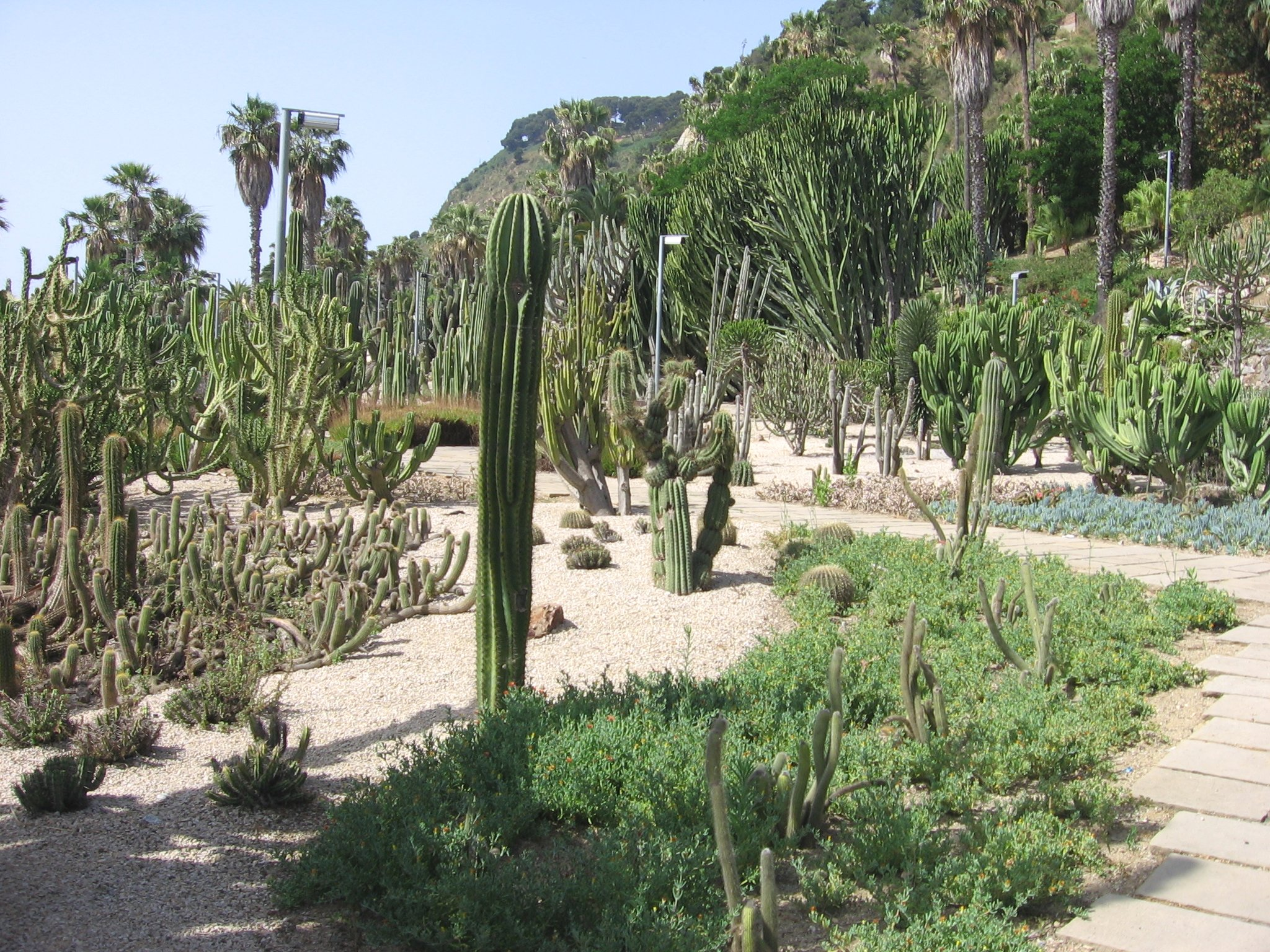
- Type: botanical garden
- Location: Montjuic in Barcelona, Spain, Catalonia; Barcelona.
- Area: 6.15 hectares (15.2 acres)
- Created: 1970
- Owner: The city of Barcelona
- Operator: Barcelona's City Council
- Status: Open all year

Mossèn Costa i Llobera Gardens is a botanical garden in the center of Barcelona, Catalonia, Spain. It is situated at the foot of Montjuïc facing the sea.

The park owes its name to the renowned Mallorcan poet Miquel Costa i Llobera. Despite the gardens taking up around 6 hectares of the Montjuïc hillside, they are some of the least known and visited gardens in the city. The gardens display many plant and tree species from the desert, subdesert, tropical areas, and highlands. There is also huge collection of cacti (about 800 different types) originating in many different continents and countries.

As well as the collection of species of cacti and succulent plants, the gardens have panoramic views over the city's coastline and port.

== History ==
Contrary to many of the other gardens around Montjuïc, which were created for the International Exhibition in 1929, the gardens Mossèn Costa i Llobera were designed and developed much later, in 1970. The gardens were built under the guidance of the architect Joan Maria Casamor and Joan Pañella Bonastre, professor at the Escuela de Jardinería de Barcelona (Barcelona's Municipal Gardening School) and they were initially used as an outdoor classroom for botany students. 1987 the New York Times included the park in the list of the "10 most beautiful gardens on the planet". 1987 was not exactly a good year for this unique collection of botanical rarities though. In the winter of 1987, the gardens suffered a harsh frost, and had just recovered from the effects of another severe frost in the winter of 1985. The second frost in 1987 was fatal to many of the plants and its variety was reduced by almost 40%.

A structural an aesthetic refurbishment was carried out between 2006 and 2011.

== Location ==
The Gardens Mossèn Costa i Llobera are located in the Barcelona’s district Sants-Montjuïc. The main entrance is located between Carretera de Miramar and Paseo de Josep Carner. This area enjoys a special microclimate between two and three degrees above the average temperature of the city. The prime reason is its orientation that protects the area from cold winds. The gardens have views of the city's coastline and its commercial harbor. The gardens cannot be seen from the city even though it is just a ten-minute walk from the Columbus Monument, at the lower end of La Rambla.

== Botany ==
A total of 800 different types of cacti and succulent plants populate the gardens. The plants originate from all over the world, but mostly from African, American, and Australian desert areas.

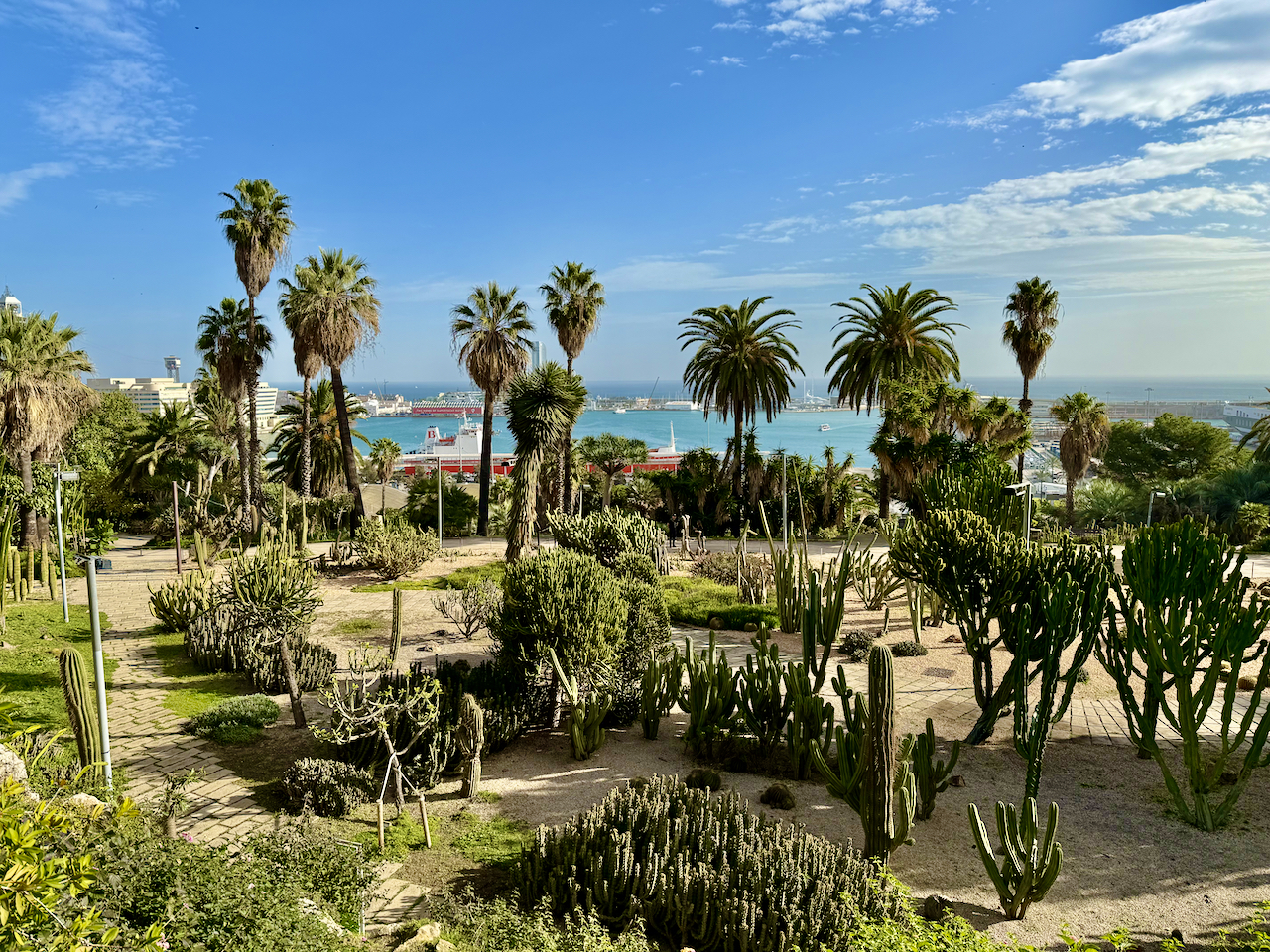
View from the Mossèn Costa i Llobera Gardens

Besides the gardens offer a wide variety of trees that are typical of the Mediterranean climates as well as other subtropical trees. One can find up to 12 different species of palm trees, olive and fig trees, and the like. Many of the subtropical trees are several hundred years old.

Some special species the garden offers are:

- Drago: a subtropical tree
- Pitas: a typical Mexican plant
- Xanthorrhoea: a native Australian plant
- Cereus jamacaru: a Brazilian cactus
- Aloe brevifolia: a cactus that originates in South Africa

== Artistic elements ==
The Mossén Costa i Llobera gardens displays many decorative and artistic elements. Among them is a pergola and many sculptures by Catalan artists, such as:

- L'au dels temporals, el Pi de Formentor by Joaquim Ros i Bofarull, which pays tribute to Costa i Llobera's poem, The Pine of Formentor
- La Puntaire by Josep Viladomat, located on a mountain outcrop that serves as a stunning viewpoint
- A Joan Pañella by Meritxell Duran, dedicated to cactus enthusiast Joan Pañella

== Climate ==
Thanks to its convenient location at the foot of the Montjuïc Mountain and next to the sea, temperatures in the middle of the gardens average two or three degrees Celsius higher than those in the rest of the area. This microclimate protects the species that are contained within the gardens. It is also protected from the intense winds that often affect the area.

== Visiting the park ==
Access to the gardens is free of charge. The park has several entrances inside Montjuic. The main entrance is located between Carretera de Miramar and Paseo de Josep Carner. The parks opens at 10 a.m. until sunset.

== See also ==
- Miquel Costa i Llobera
- Desert City
- Jardín de Cactus
- Parks and gardens of Barcelona
