= Formentor Lighthouse =

Lighthouse on Mallorca, Spain

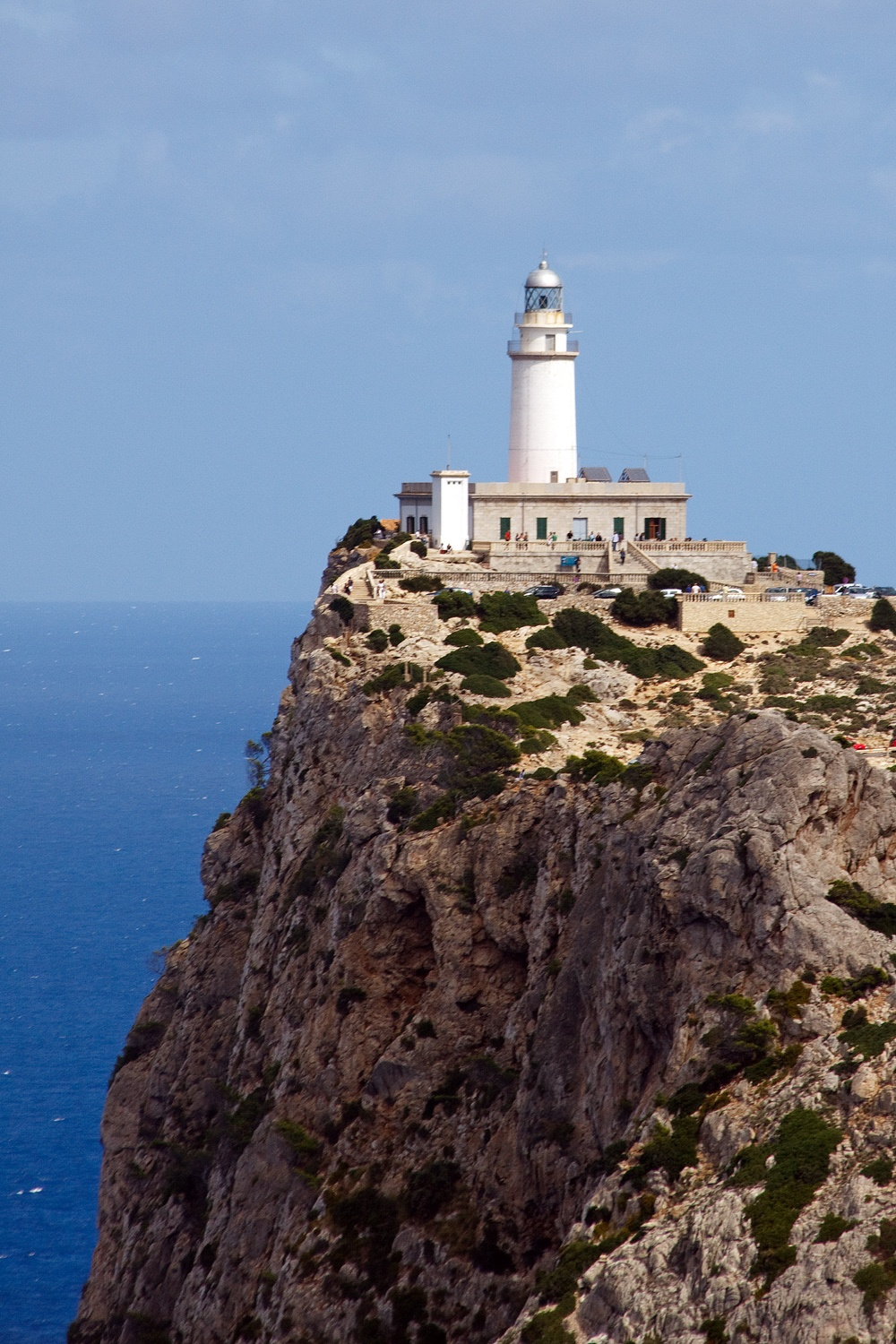
- Location: Cap de Formentor; Majorca; Spain
- Coordinates: 39°57′41″N 3°12′44″E

Tower
- Constructed: 1863
- Construction: masonry tower
- Height: 22 metres (72 ft)
- Shape: cylindrical tower with double balcony and lantern
- Markings: white tower and buildings, grey lantern
- Power source: mains electricity
- Operator: Comisión de faros

Light
- Focal height: 210 metres (690 ft)
- Range: 24 nautical miles (44 km; 28 mi)
- Characteristic: Fl(4) W 20s
- Spain no.: ES-32900

The Formentor (Catalan: Far de Formentor) or Cap de Formentor Lighthouse is an active lighthouse on the Spanish island of Majorca.

It is the highest lighthouse in the Balearic Islands with a focal height of 210 metres (690 ft) above sea level, located on high cliffs at the tip of Cap de Formentor.

== See also ==
- List of lighthouses in Spain
- List of lighthouses in the Balearic Islands
