= Miquel Costa i Llobera =

Spanish priest and poet

Venerable Miquel Costa i Llobera
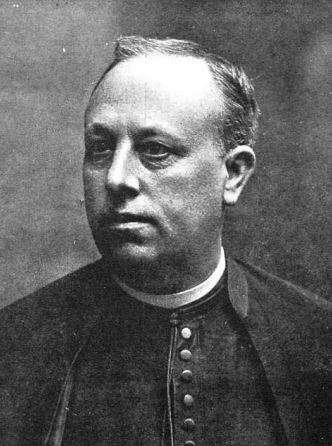
- Portrait of Miquel Costa i Llobera
- Born: Miquel Costa i Llobera; 10 March 1854; Pollença, Spain
- Died: 16 October 1922 (aged 68); Palma de Mallorca, Spain
- Resting place: Església Parroquial de la Mare de Déu dels Àngels, Pollença
- Major works: The Pine of Formentor; La deixa del geni grec; Horacianes

Miquel Costa i Llobera (10 March 1854 – 16 October 1922) was a Spanish priest and poet from Majorca. He mainly wrote in Catalan language.

He is regarded as a prominent figure of Catalan poetry. Marcelino Menéndez y Pelayo described him as an excellent lyric poet who would rank among the greatest in any nation and during the finest literary periods.

== Biography ==
=== Early years, romanticism, and The Pine of Formentor ===
Born in the Majorcan town of Pollença, Spain, in 1854, he was the son of a family of rural owners and was orphaned as a mother at the age of eleven. He grew up very influenced by his uncle, a medical doctor in Pollença, who introduced him to the local landscape and his interest in classical literature.

He studied in Madrid and Barcelona, where he met Antoni Rubió i Lluch and was a disciple of the writer Josep Lluís Pons i Gallarza. In 1874 he won an award at the Floral Games. He cultivated, in a first stage, romantic poetry, exemplified in his best-known poem, The Pine of Formentor (1875), an ode to a pine tree of Formentor, which later inspired artists such as Joan Miró and Anglada Camarasa. This ode was also included in his volume Poesies, published in 1885.

=== Classicism, and ordination in Rome ===
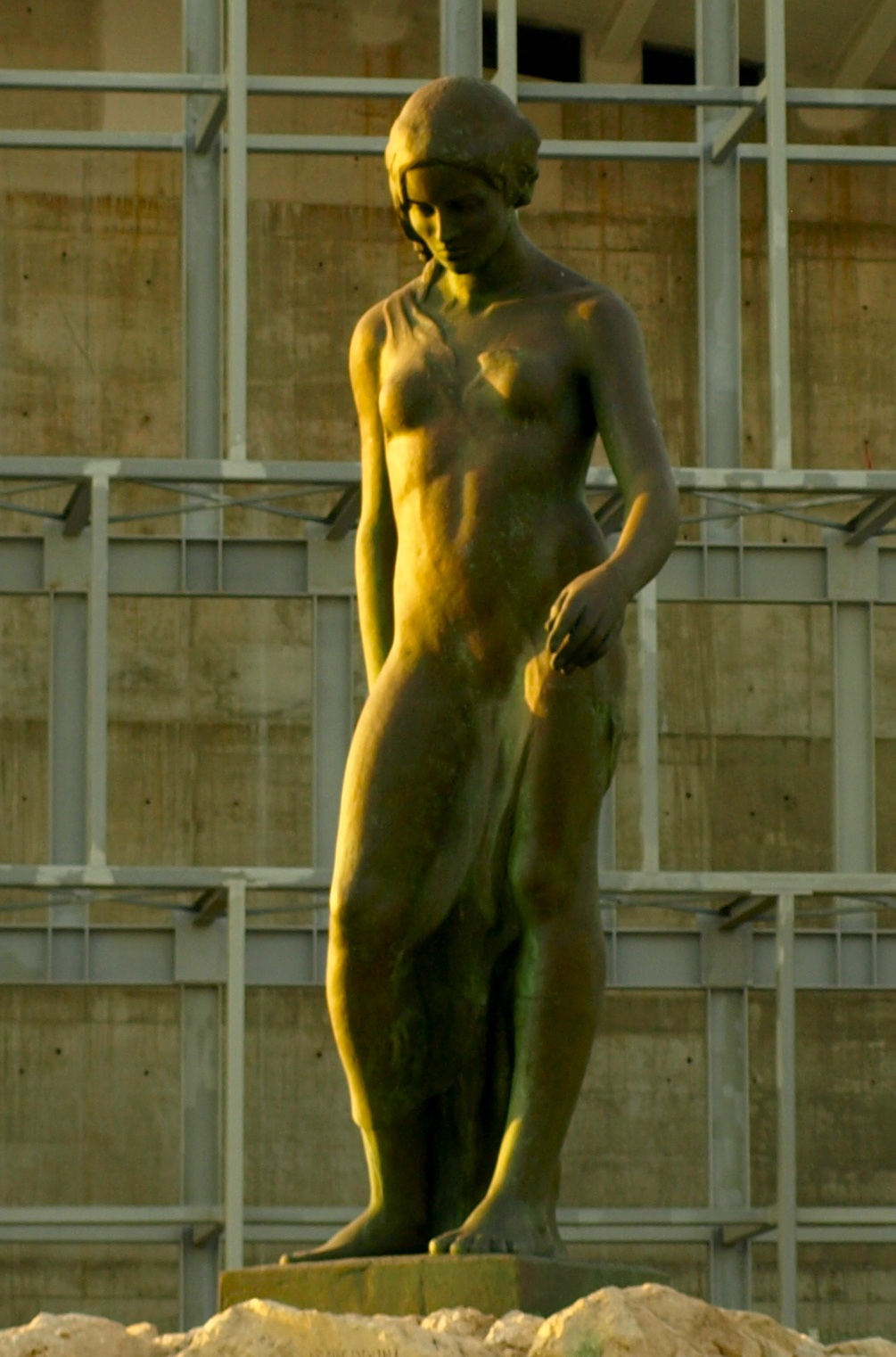
Statue of Nuredduna, as a tribute to the poet in Palma de Mallorca

He devoted much time reading the classics, especially Horace and Virgil. In 1879 the poet composed his famous ode A Horaci ("To Horace"), which he would later publish. Meanwhile, he sent the ode to Ramon Picó i Campamar and Antoni Rubió i Lluch, the latter being the one who would issue a more favorable judgment. In addition, Rubió sent the ode to his common friend and erudite Marcelino Menéndez y Pelayo, who would decide to include it in his book Horacio en España, stating that the ode of the young Mallorcan poet was one of the purest and most beautiful sapphic odes of his time.

In October 1885 he moved to Rome, where he was ordained a priest on September 22, 1888, and in 1889 he obtained a doctorate in theology from the Pontifical Gregorian University. In 1890 he returned to the island of Mallorca.

In 1899 he published Líricas, his only volume written in Spanish, collecting poems composed during his stay in Italy, Madrid and Mallorca. The volume was well received by friends and benefactors, mainly by Antonio Rubió y Lluch, and by critics such as Juan Valera or Marcelino Menéndez y Pelayo.

In 1900 he began composing his long poem titled La deixa del geni grec ("The Legacy of Greek Genius"). The narrative recounts a story of sailors from Ancient Greece who were captured by the native Balearic slinger tribes of the island, and features one of Costa i Llobera's most famous characters, the legendary seeress Nuredduna. This epic poem was later turned into an opera.

In 1902 he earned the title of Mestre en Gai Saber, the highest distinction for a Catalan-language poet. He was also appointed as member of the Royal Spanish Academy.

=== Success of Horacianes, and pilgrimage ===
In 1906 he published his most important collection of poems, named Horacianes ("Poems in the manner of Horace"). These Horacianes were, therefore, a set of poems dedicated to the Latin poet Horace. With very careful language, the poet rigorously dealt with classical poetic and literary forms. The book is made of a total of sixteen poems or odes, which attempt to reproduce in the Catalan language the verse forms of Ancient Greek and Roman poetry. The book was very well received in Catalonia, and also by Spanish critics, such as Marcelino Menéndez y Pelayo, who praised again the poet's metric innovations and went so far as to describe his verses as "worthy of being among the best that are written in Spain today". From abroad, Frédéric Mistral, who had received the 1904 Nobel Prize in Literature, sent his compliments to Miquel Costa i Llobera in a letter written in Occitan, deeming his odes "melodious" and "worthy of the laurels of Tiber.”

The same year, he gave the inaugural address of the Barcelona Floral Games and participated in the International Congress of the Catalan Language. In 1907 he published Poesies, a revisited edition of the work he had already published in 1885.

Later in 1907, the author, accompanied by other Majorcans such as the poet Maria Antònia Salvà, began a pilgrimage through the Middle East, which ended in Palestine and the Holy Land. Costa i Llobera kept a diary of the trip, captured in the book Visions de Palestina (1908). Thereby the poet expressed the sensations and impressions that the sacred sites produced on him. The same year, Costa i Llobera gave the inaugural address of the Jocs Florals of Girona.

=== Final years ===
After the events of the Tragic Week in Catalonia, the poet decided to diminish his pace of literary production. He published two exercises of Via crucis (1907–1908) and the Sermons panegírics (1916). In 1919 he was appointed corresponding member of the Institute of Catalan Studies. At that time, he translated texts by Virgil, Petrarch, Victor Hugo and Dante Alighieri. Between 1912 and 1922 he translated the hymns of Prudentius.

In 1922, he died in Palma de Mallorca, Spain, suddenly in the pulpit, while preaching. His body was buried in the family pantheon of the cemetery of Pollença, which proclaimed him an illustrious son. The process of his beatification is open.

== Works ==
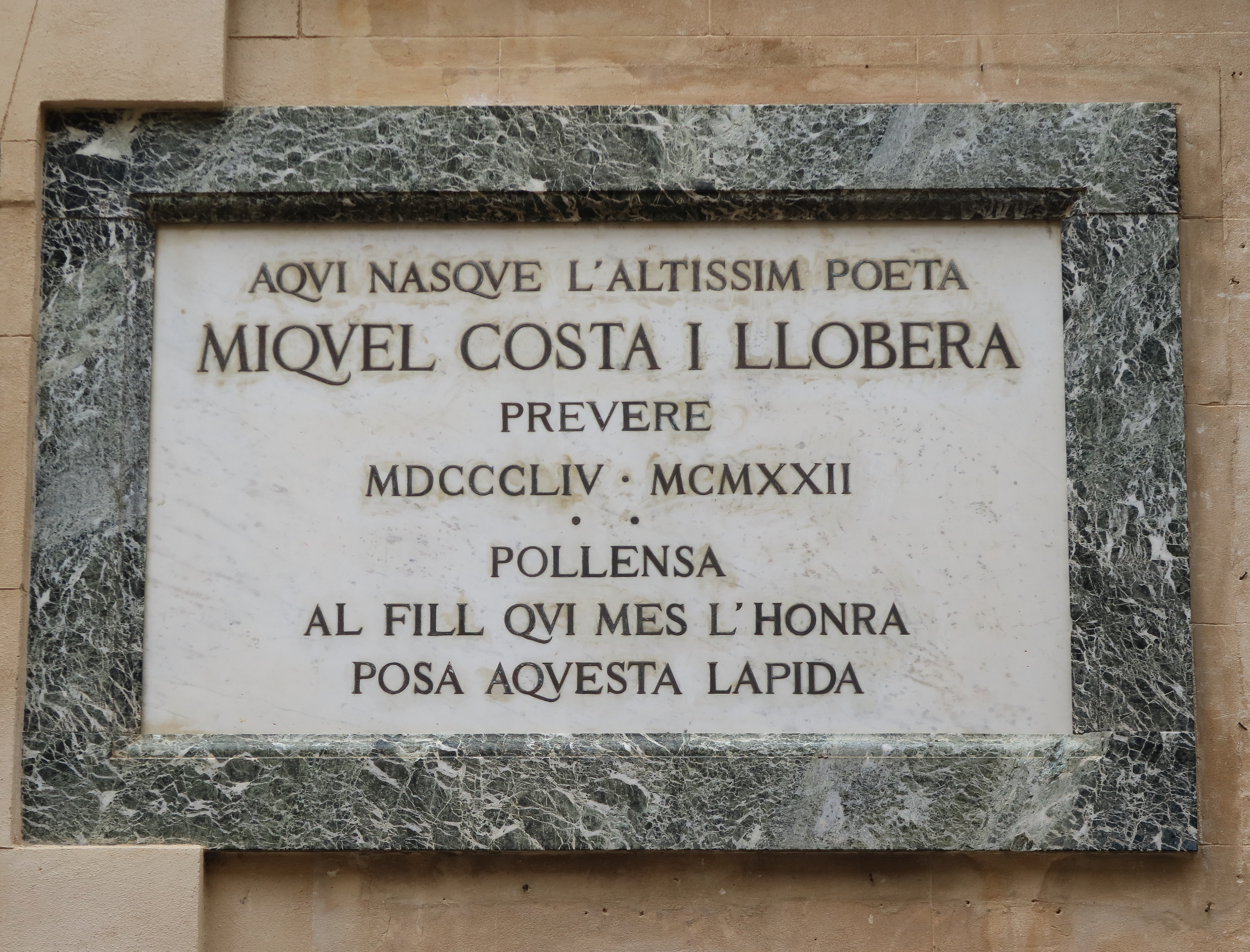
Memorial plate at the birthplace of Costa i Llobera in Pollença

- 1875: The Pine of Formentor
- 1885: Poesies ("Poems")
- 1885: Oda a Horaci ("Ode to Horace")
- 1897: De l'agre de la terra ("From the bitterness of the earth")
- 1899: Líricas (written in Spanish)
- 1901: La deixa del geni grec ("The legacy of the Greek genius")
- 1903: Tradicions i fantasies ("Traditions and fantasies")
- 1906: Horacianes ("Poems in the manner of Horace")
- 1908: Visions de Palestina ("Visions of Palestine")
- 1916: Sermons panegírics ("Panegyric sermons")

Translation:

- Himnes de Prudenci

== Tribute ==
In 1970, on the mountain of Montjuïc in Barcelona, the Mossèn Costa i Llobera Gardens were created, a botanical garden dedicated to the poet.

Several schools in Spain bear the name of the poet: one in the Can Caralleu neighborhood of Barcelona, another in Pollença, another in the city center of Palma and another in the municipality of Marratxí.

To commemorate the centenary of the death of the poet, the City Council of Pollença approved that the year 2022 should be proclaimed as Any Costa i Llobera.

A diocesan process began for his beatification on 15 October 1982. On 19 January 2023, Pope Francis promulgated the decree that recognized the heroic virtue of Costa i Llobera and declared him a Venerable.

On 3 February 2025, an asteroid was named after him: (397800) Costaillobera.

== See also ==
- Mossèn Costa i Llobera Gardens
- Catalan language poets
