= The Pine of Formentor =

Catalan poem

Lo pi de Formentor, from the 1885 edition of the book Poesies.

The Pine of Formentor (Catalan: Lo Pi de Formentor, Spanish: El pino de Formentor) is one of the most well-known and celebrated poems by Miquel Costa i Llobera. Technically, it is considered as the culmination of Romantic poetry in Catalan literature.

== History ==
Miquel Costa i Llobera wrote the poem in Catalan language in 1875, during his first period of production, when he was only 21 years old.

To compose it, the poet took inspiration from the majestic landscapes and visions of the pine trees rooted in the cliffs of the Formentor peninsula on Mallorca island. He frequented those sites from an early age. The landscape of Formentor portrayed by Costa i Llobera is real, whilst being a symbol of the Mediterranean. Reflecting the ideal of an elevated life, the pine tree also serves as a metaphor for our life's struggles, echoing lessons of constancy and strength.

Years later, in 1899, he published a version of the poem in Spanish.

== Structure of the poem ==
The poem is written entirely in alexandrine verses (6+6 syllables), with caesurae in the middle. It is composed of quintain stanzas, with an ABAAB rhyme. The last line of each quintain contains only 6 syllables.

Its beginning is often quoted in Catalan:

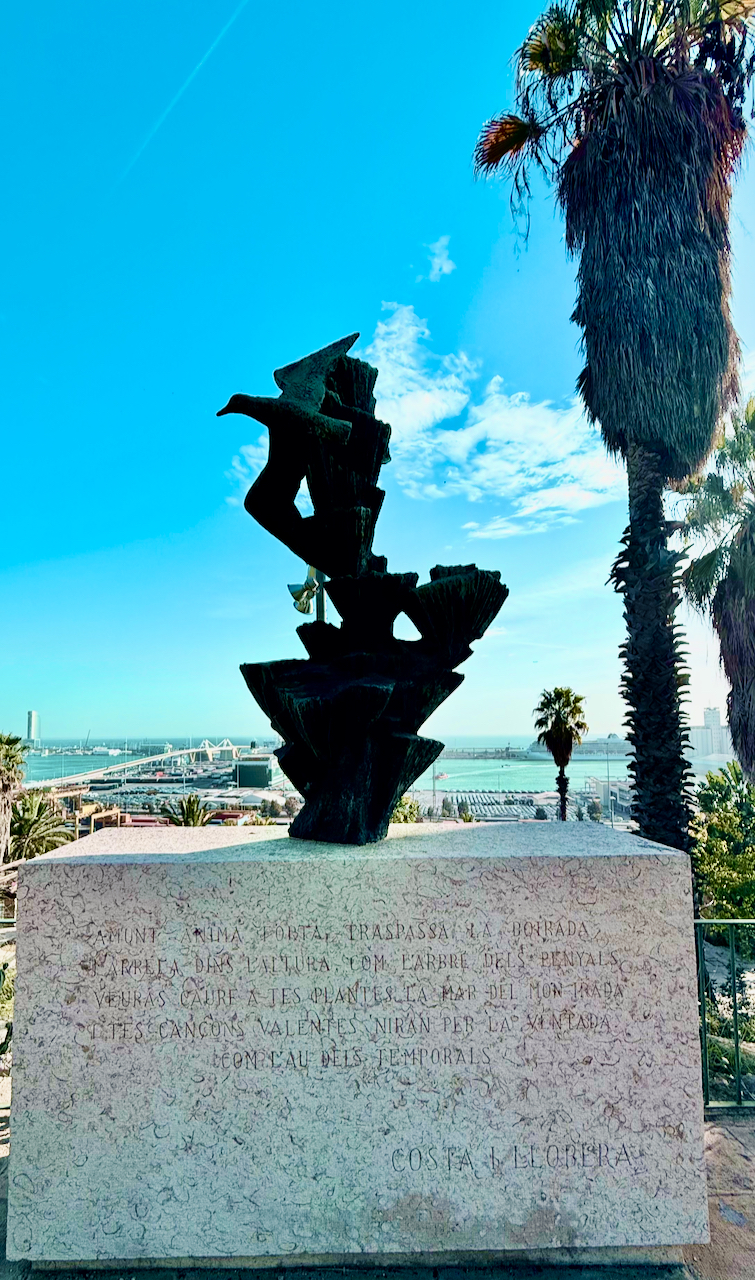
Statue paying tribute to the poem in Montjuic, Barcelona

Mon cor estima un arbre! Més vell que l'olivera,
més poderós que el roure, més verd que el taronger,
conserva de ses fulles l'eterna primavera,
i lluita amb les ventades que assalten la ribera,
com un gegant guerrer.

Whilst Costa i Llobera himself would publish a translation years later, in Spanish. The same first stanza reads:

Hay en mi tierra un árbol que el corazón venera:
de cedro es su ramaje, de césped su verdor;
anida entre sus hojas perenne primavera,
y arrostra los turbiones que azotan la ribera,
añoso luchador.

== Legacy and tribute ==
The poem has been sung, among others, by Spanish singer Maria del Mar Bonet.

In his Symphony No. 16 - Songs of Mallorca, English composer Derek Bourgeois named the first movement The Pine of Formentor.

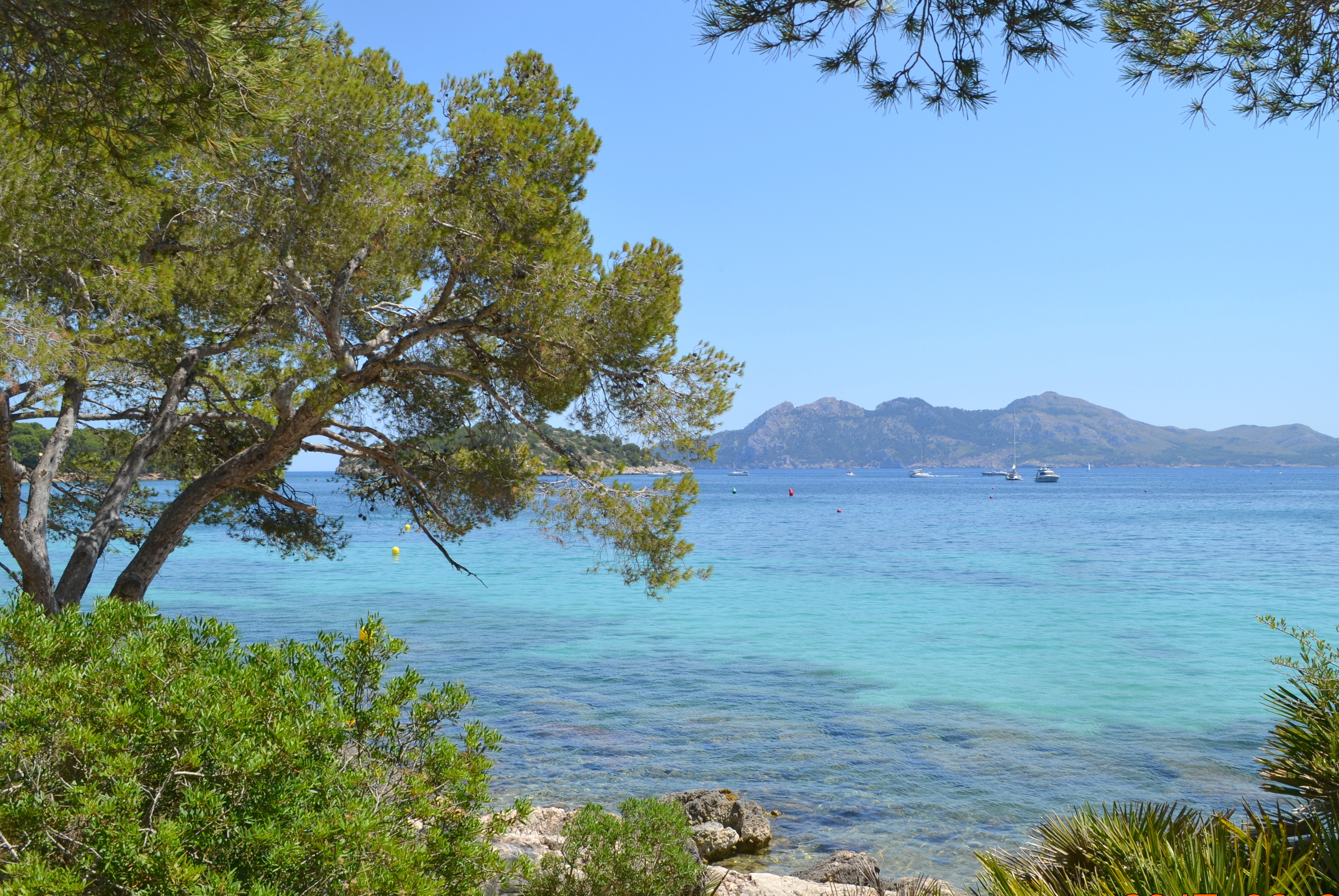
Formentor beach and its pine trees

Artists such as Joan Miró and Hermen Anglada Camarasa used it as inspiration for their paintings.

The statue L'au dels temporals, el Pi de Formentor by Joaquim Ros i Bofarull, pays tribute to The Pine of Formentor in Barcelona, located in the Mossèn Costa i Llobera Gardens.

== See also ==
- Miquel Costa i Llobera
- Formentor
