= Cap de Formentor =

Northernmost point of Mallorca, Spain

Coordinates: 39°56′50″N 3°10′51″E

Cap de Formentor (Standard Catalan: [ˈkab də foɾmənˈto], Balearic Catalan: [ˈcad də foɾmənˈto]) is the northernmost point of Mallorca, on the Formentor peninsula.

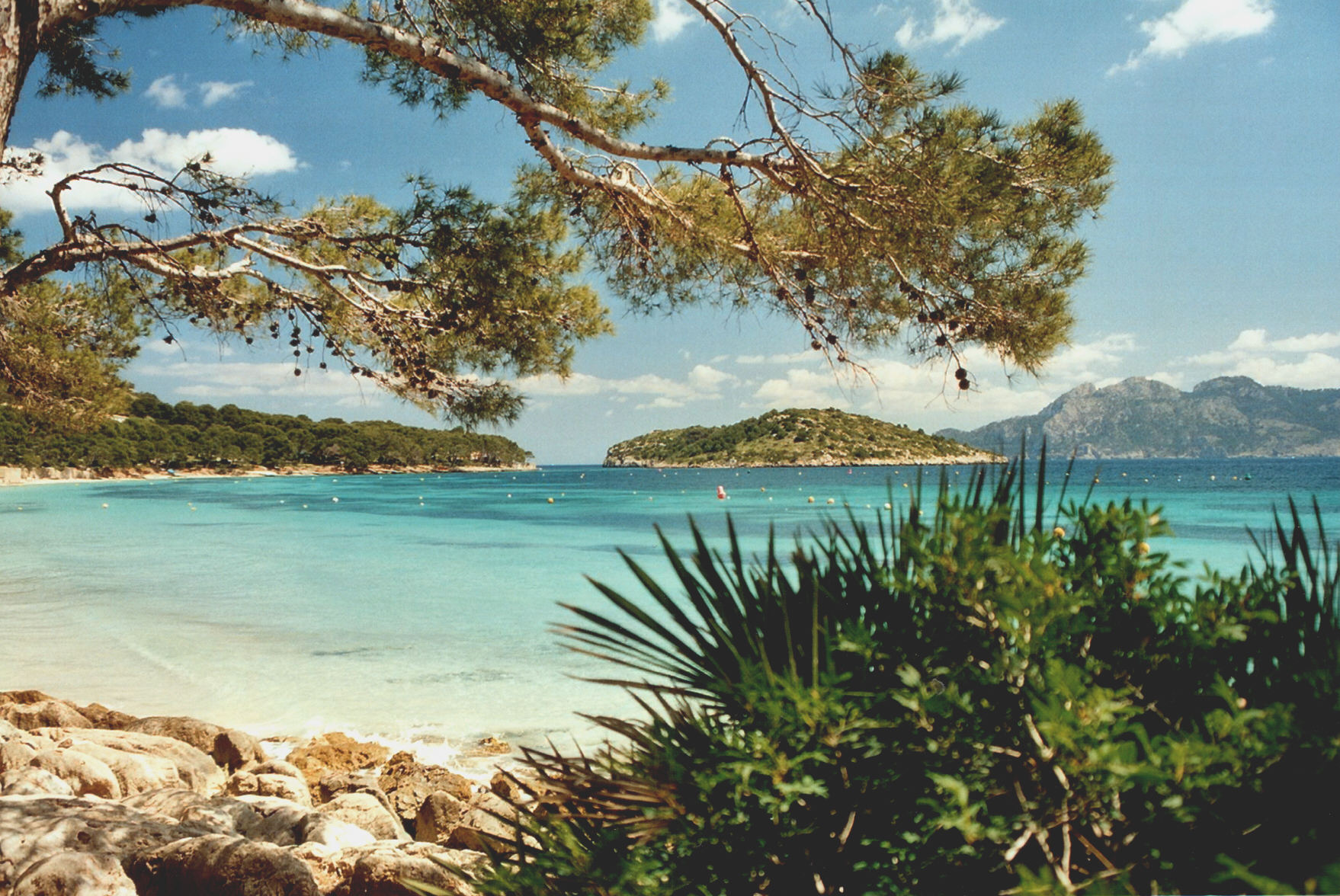
Beach near Hotel Formentor

== Location ==
Cap de Formentor is located on the northernmost point of Mallorca within the Balearic Islands in Spain. Its highest point, Fumat, is 384 m above sea level. It has many associated bays, including Cala Figuera, Cala Murta and Cala Pi de la Posada.

The Mallorcans also call the cape the "Meeting point of the winds".

== History ==
In 1863, the Formentor Lighthouse was opened, the remote and rugged location on the Cap de Formentor making construction difficult. The only access was from the sea or via a long mule track.

Following the death of the renowned Mallorcan poet Miquel Costa i Llobera, author of the famous poem The Pine of Formentor and owner of the Cap de Formentor peninsula, it was divided into lots and sold. In 1928 Adan Diehl, an Argentinian native and art lover, decided to build the Hotel Formentor.

The 13.5 km road which runs from Port de Pollença to Cap de Formentor was built by the Mallorcan engineer Antonio Parietti in 1925. He also constructed the snake road to Sa Calobra. As usual for mountain roads, when the slope is too steep, the road has to go oblique and switch direction when needed.

== Attractions ==
The headland has a number of lookout and viewing points, including Mirador del Mal Pas, also named Mirador d'es Colomer after the small island Colomer. The panorama from Mallorca's Finisterre illuminates Menorca in the east, Cala Figuera in the west, and Alcudia with its sandy beach in the south. However, the view of the cliffs below is not for sufferers of vertigo as sea roars 300m below and the winds on the headland can be vicious.

In the southeastern part, by Racó de Xot, there is a cave with an opening into the sea. It has two entrances located about 8 meters over the surface of the water. The cave has a length of 90 meters and a height of 8 meters and is one of the most important sources of information for the prehistoric talaiot culture.

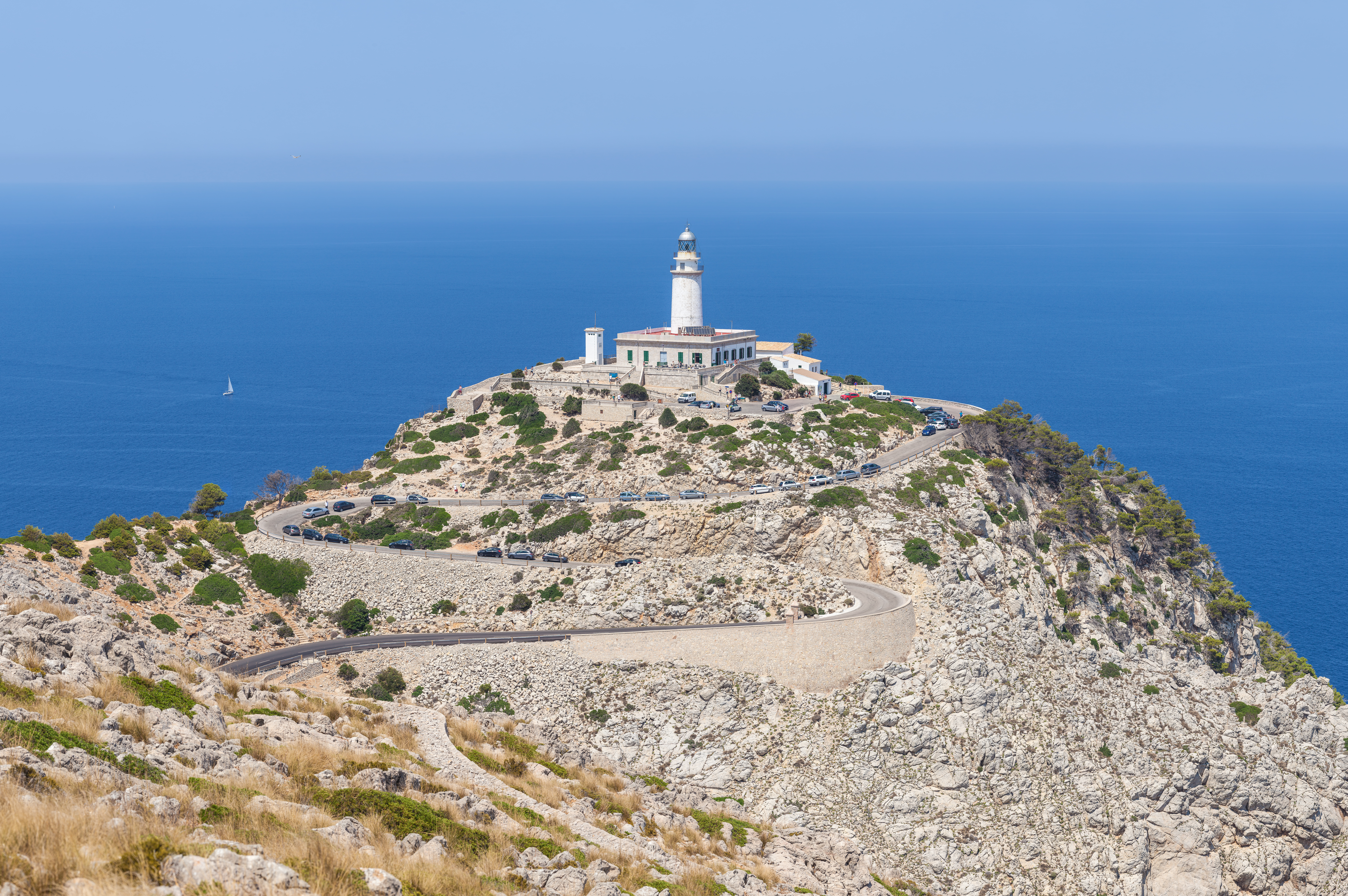
Lighthouse at Cap de Formentor, Mallorca

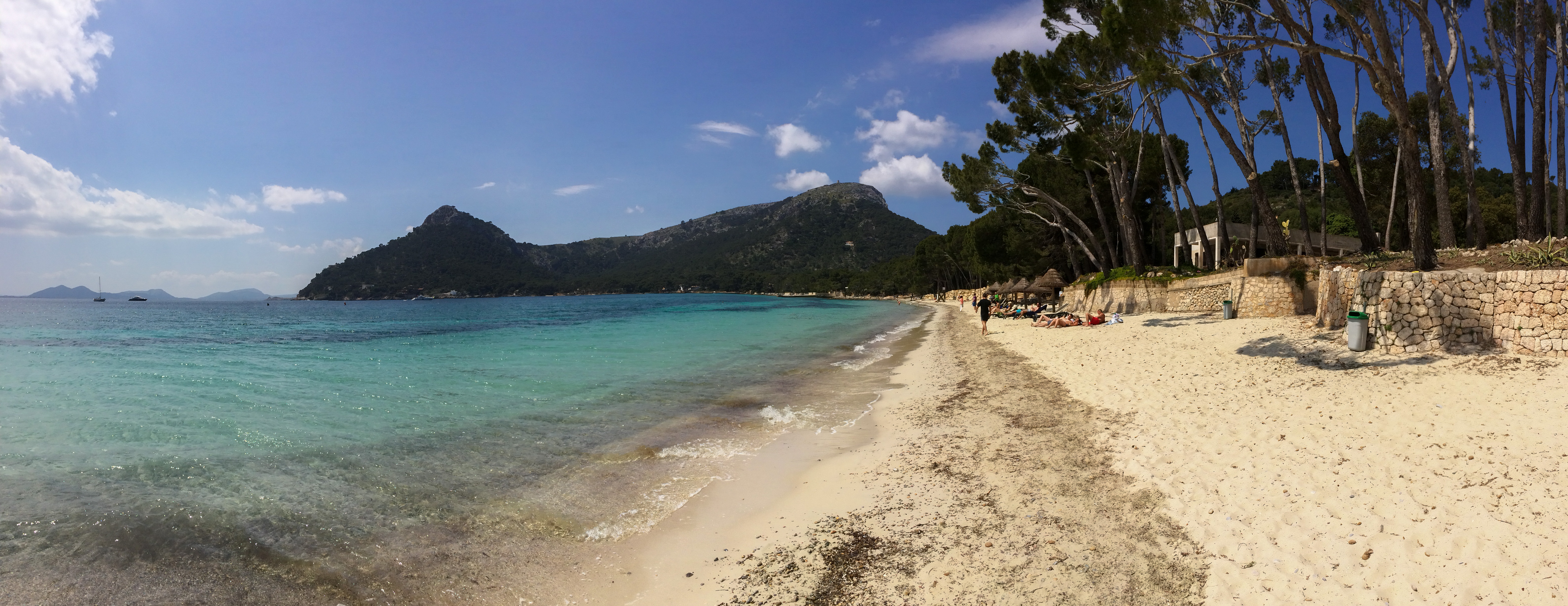
Formentor Beach

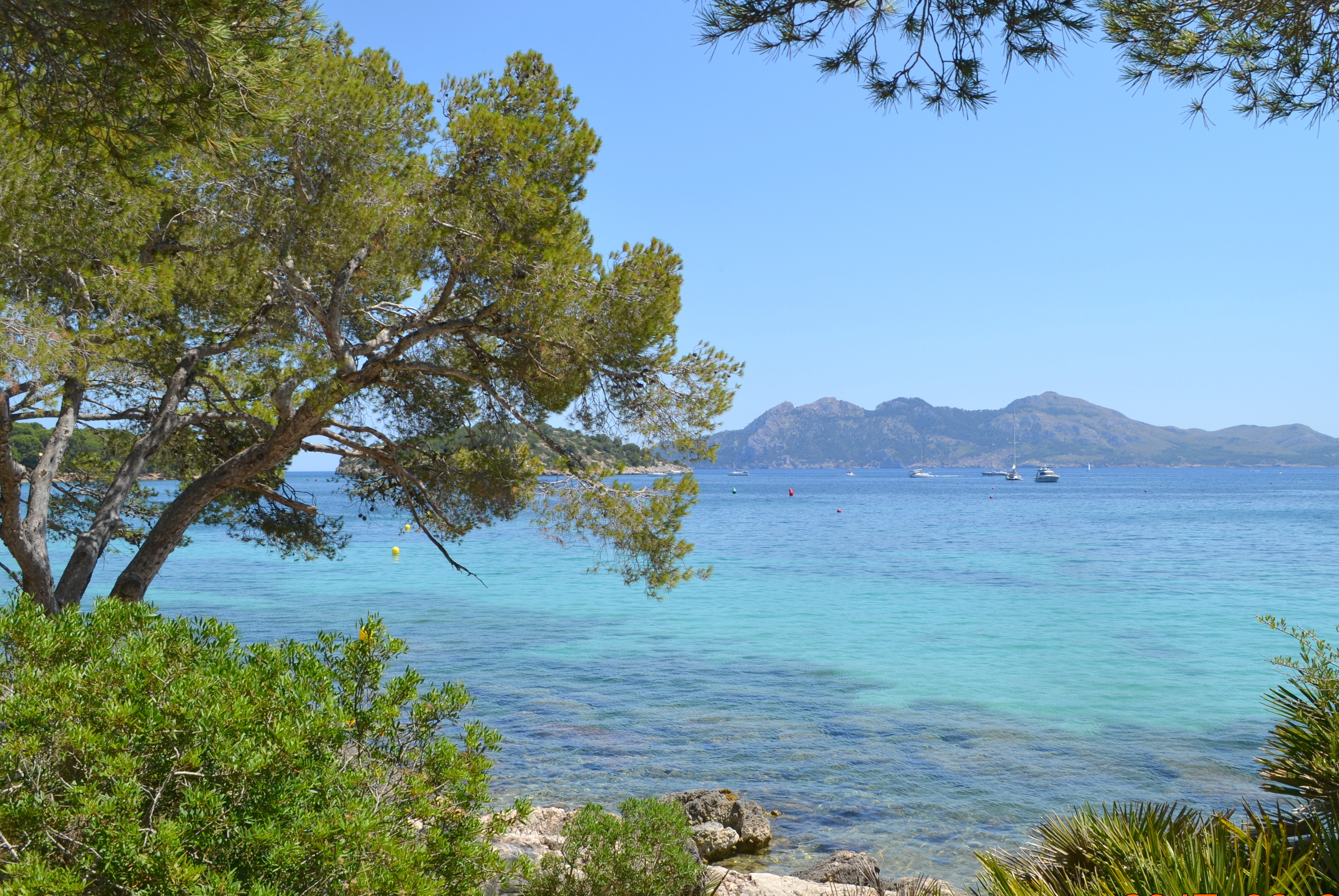
A pine tree in Formentor inspired the local poet Miquel Costa i Llobera

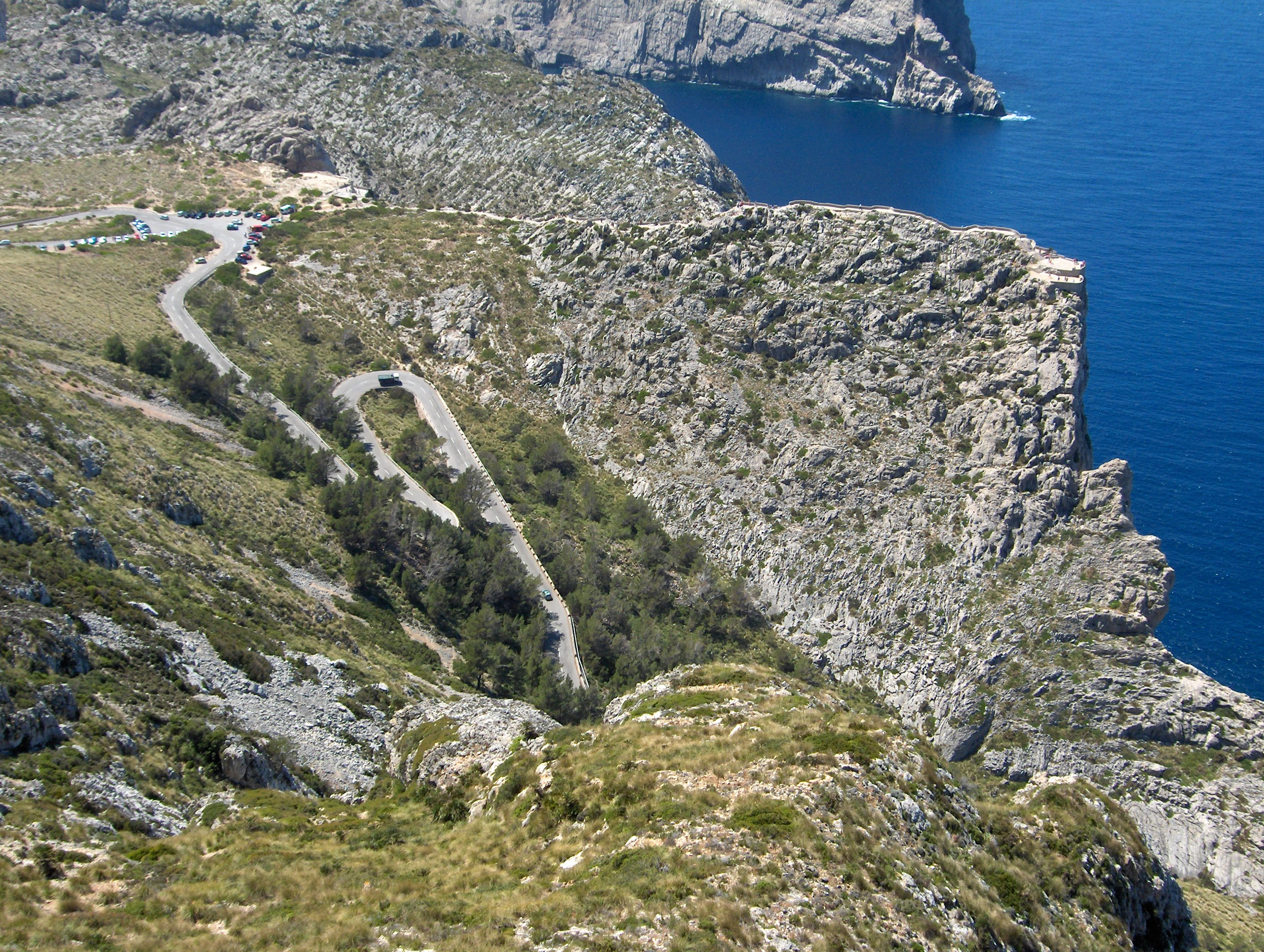
Punta de la Nao and road to the cape

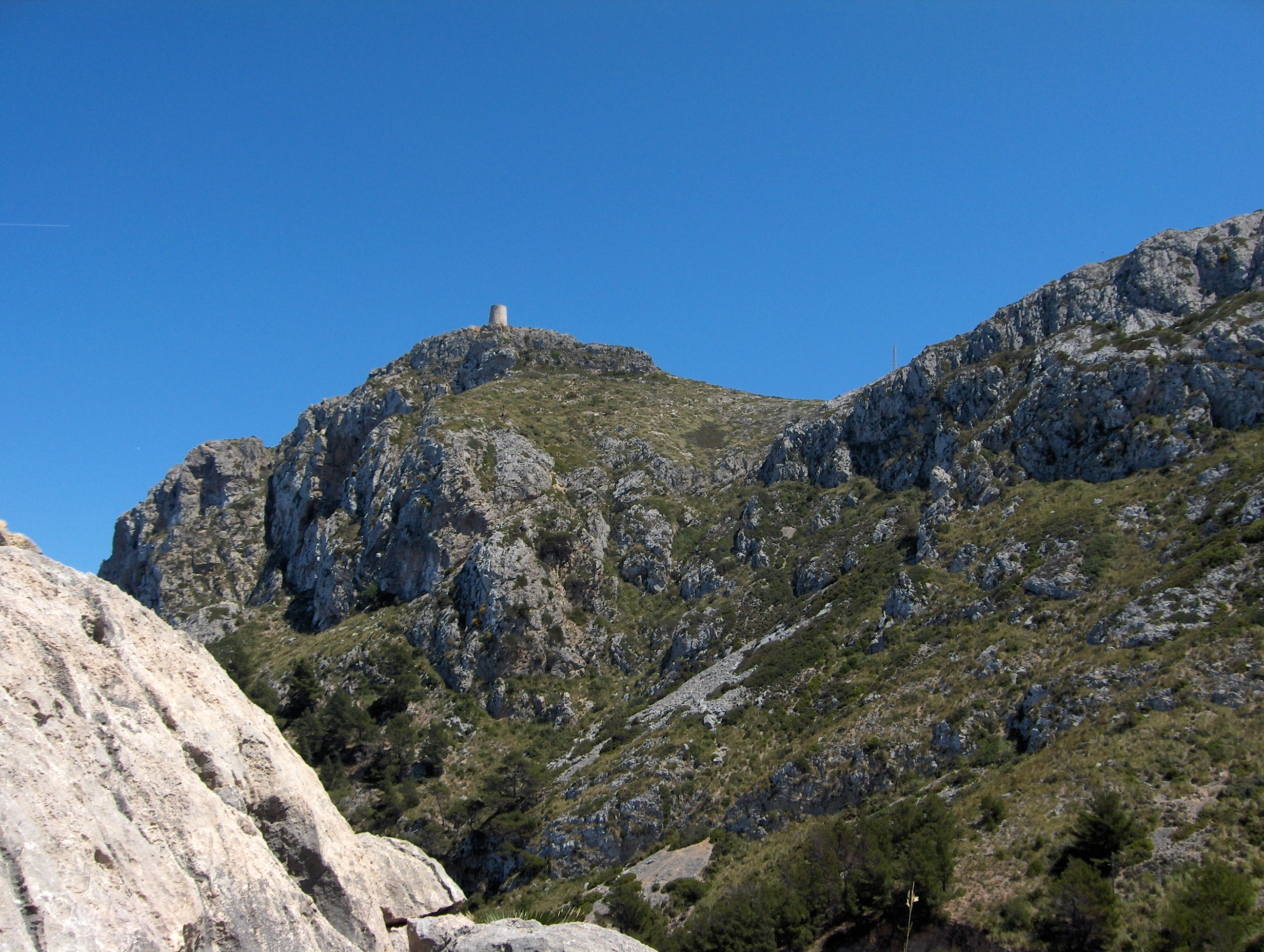
The old watchtower as seen from Punta de la Nao

== See also ==
- The Pine of Formentor
- Prix Formentor
- Formentor Lighthouse
