= Jardín de Cactus =

Botanical garden in the Canary Islands

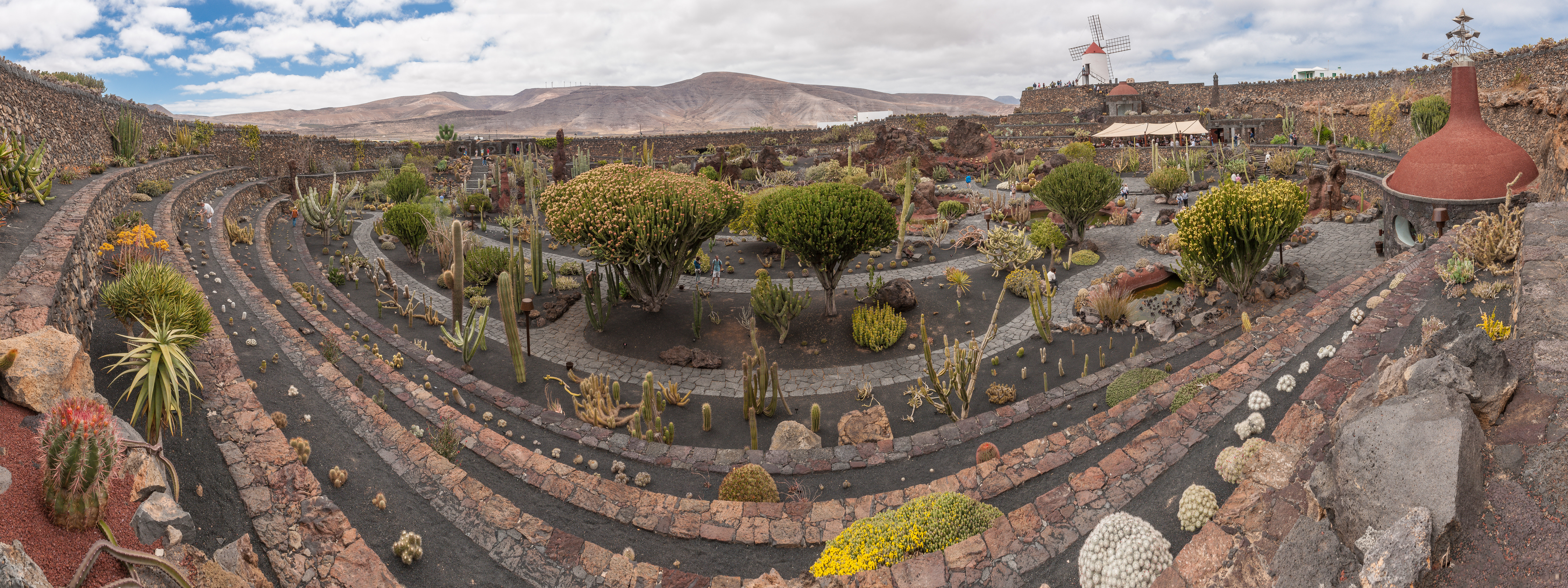
- Interactive map of Jardín de Cactus
- Type: cactus garden
- Location: Canary Islands, Spain
- Coordinates: 29°04′49″N 13°28′35″W
- Opened: 1991
- Website: www.cactlanzarote.com/cact/jardin-de-cactus/

The Jardín de Cactus is a cactus garden on the island of Lanzarote in the Canary Islands. It is situated in the village of Guatiza, in a former quarry where volcanic sand lapilli (volcanic pyroclast, locally called "picón" or "rofe") was extracted to spread on cultivated areas to retain moisture. Prickly pears are grown in the area for the production of cochineal, an insect from which the natural dye carmine is derived.

== History ==
The cactus garden was created in 1991, the last project of César Manrique. The botanist Estanislao González Ferrer was responsible for the selection and planting of the specimens. The garden now has 4,500 examples of 450 species of cactus and succulents from North and South America, Madagascar, and other desert and arid areas.

The garden is in the shape of a large amphitheatre, with the plants arranged in terraces. A restored windmill, once used in the production of gofio, stands at the highest point.

== See also ==
- Desert City
- Mossèn Costa i Llobera Gardens
