= Guatiza =

- Village
- Location in Canary Islands Guatiza (Canary Islands)
- Coordinates: 29°4′30″N 13°28′45″W
- Country: Spain
- Autonomous community: Canary Islands
- Province: Las Palmas
- Island: Lanzarote
- Municipality: Teguise
- Elevation: 95 m (312 ft)

Population (2013)
  - Total: 812
- Time zone: UTC+00:00 (WET)
  - Summer (DST): UTC+01:00 (WEST)
- Postal code: 35544

Guatiza is a village in the municipality of Teguise in the northeastern part of the island of Lanzarote in the Las Palmas province in the Canary Islands. Its population was 812 in 2013.

Guatiza is located 2 km from the east coast of Lanzarote, 8 km east of the town Teguise and 14 km northeast of the island capital Arrecife. Guatiza is known for its cactus garden, created by César Manrique. It covers 5,000 m² and has over 1,400 types of cactus and over 1,000 different species from America, Madagascar and the Canary Islands.

Guatiza was originally located on a slope of the mountain in which the cemetery stands today. In history, the Moors sacked Guatiza's homes several times in the past this was the reason that the homes are now located in a secure area from the pirates.

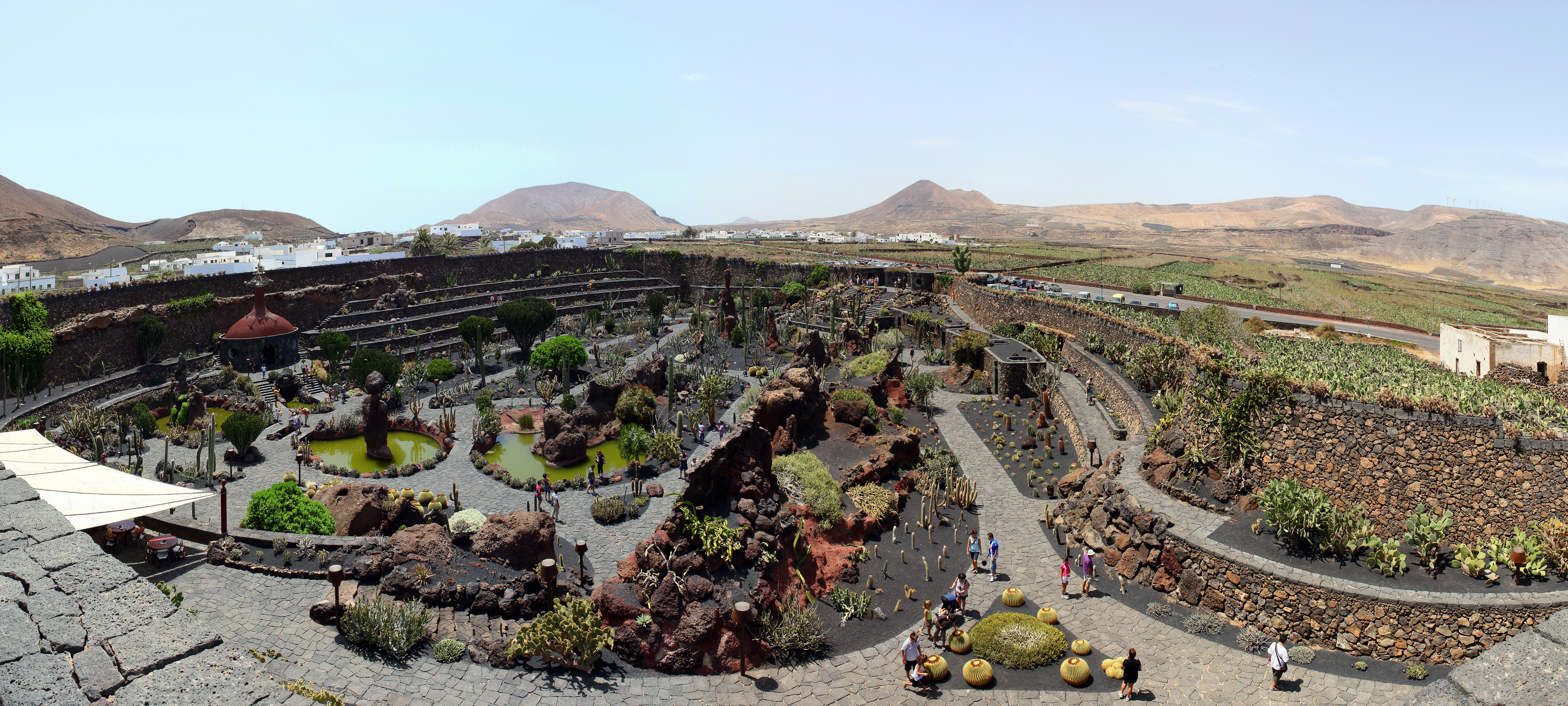
Jardín de Cactus
