= Jameos del Agua =

Series of lava caves in Lanzarote, Canary Islands, Spain

Coordinates: 29.1572°N 13.4305°W

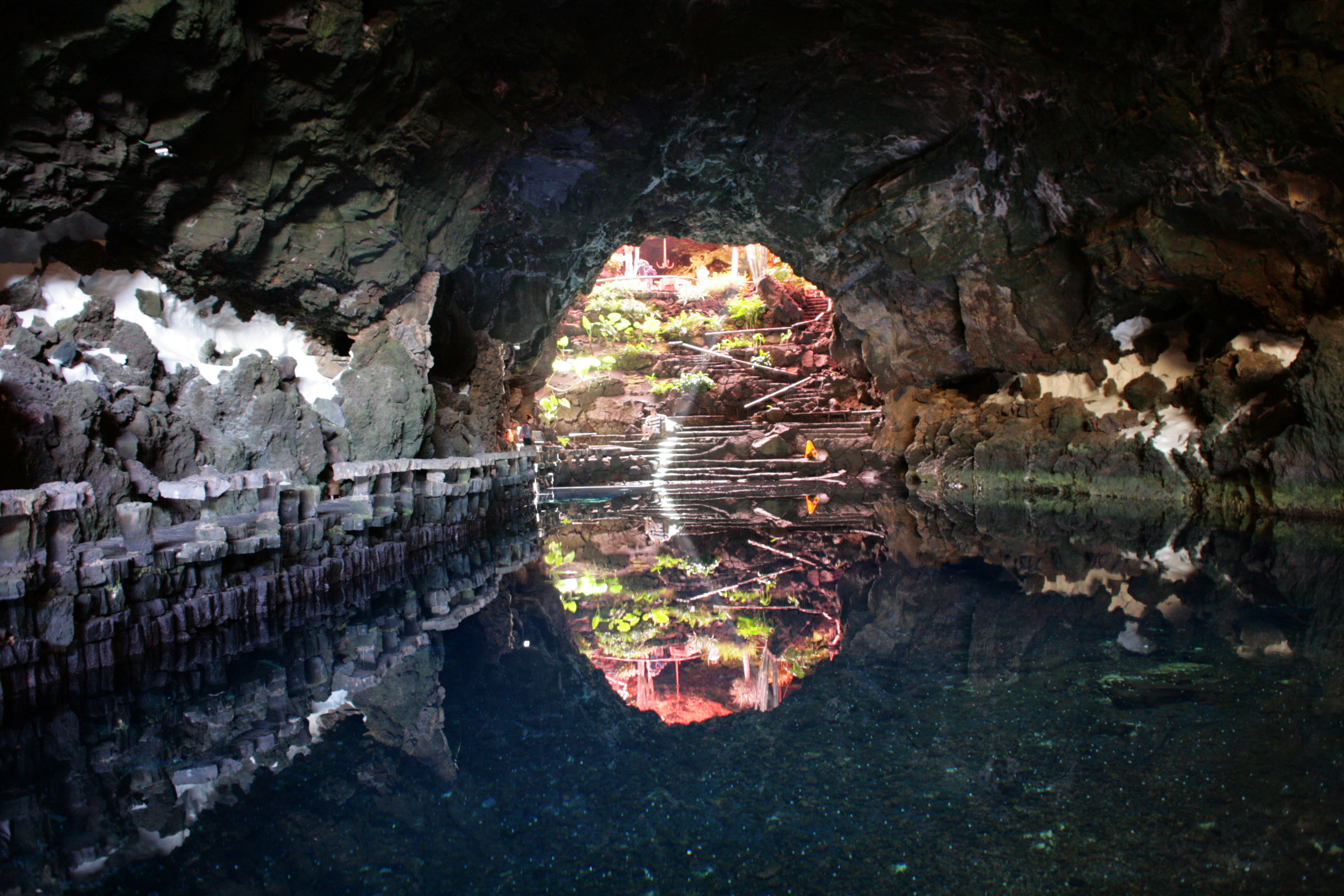
Subterranean salt lake

Jameos del Agua is a series of lava caves, located in the municipality of Haría in northern Lanzarote, Canary Islands, Spain. It is also an art, culture and tourism center, created by local artist and architect, César Manrique, and managed by the government of Lanzarote. Jameos del Agua consists of a subterranean salt lake, restaurant, gardens, emerald-green pool, museum and auditorium.

== Geological structure ==
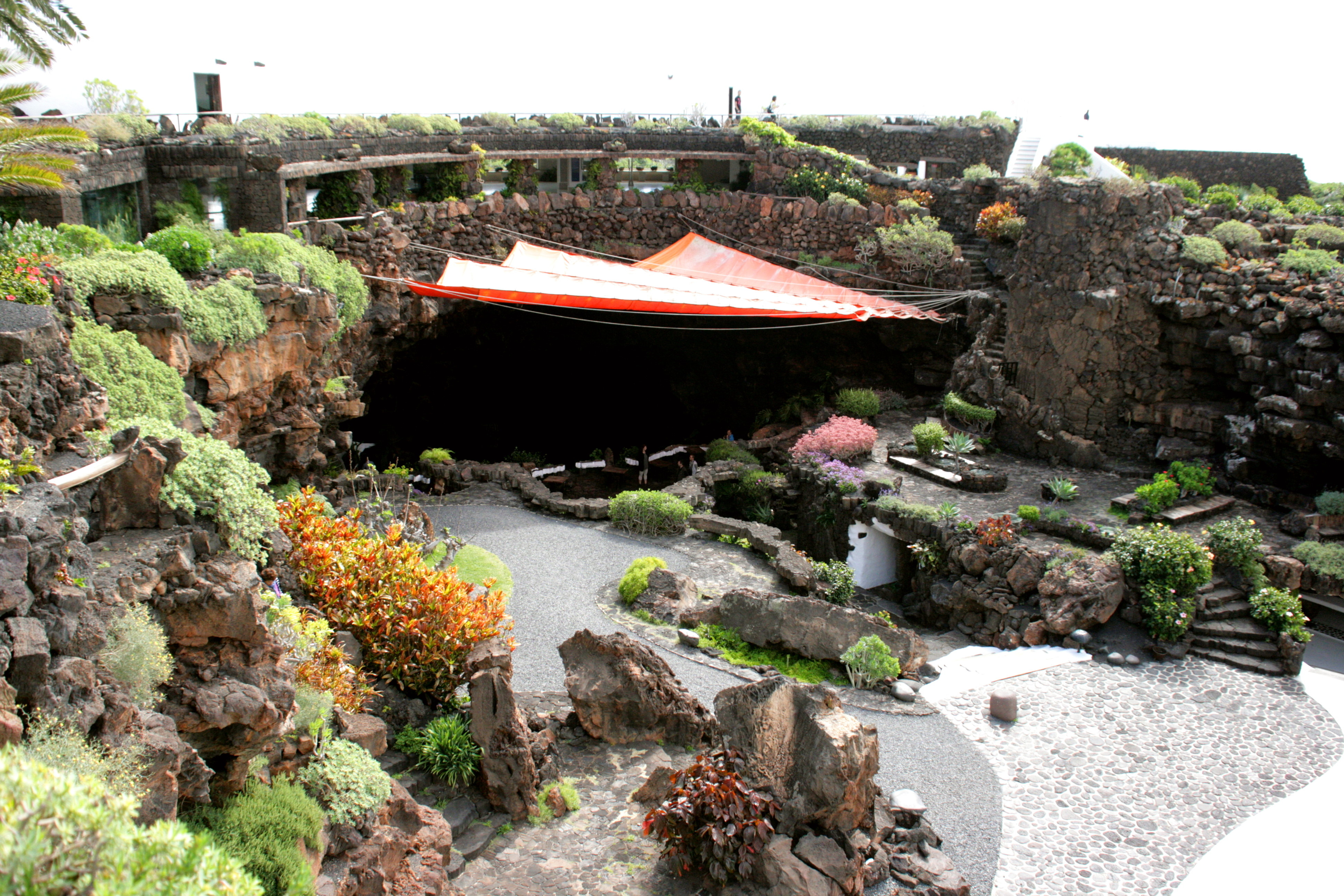
Jameos del Agua

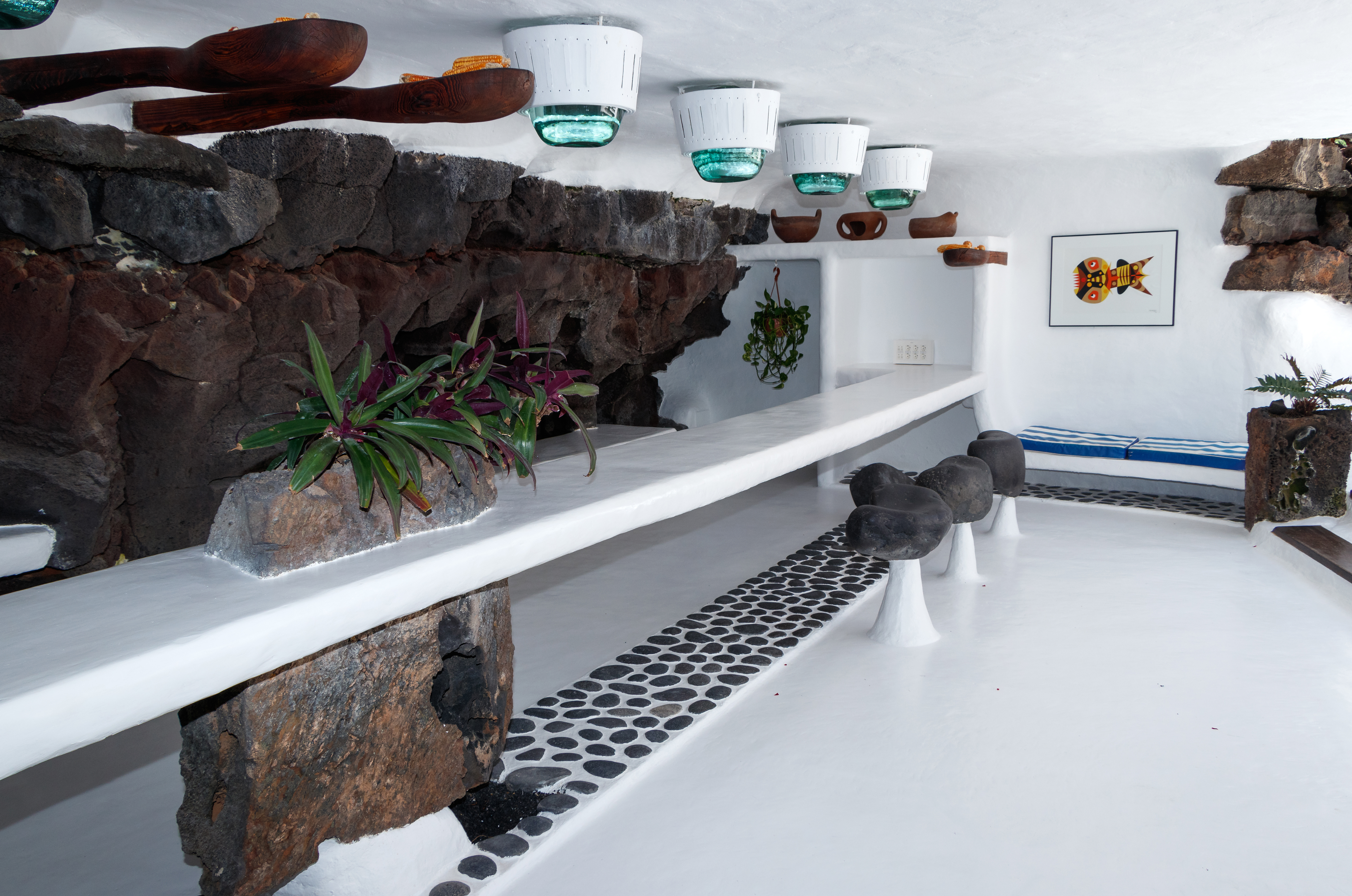
Bar by César Manrique

The Guanche language word jameo refers to a large opening in a lava tube, which is formed when parts of the roof collapse. Both Jameos del Agua and Cueva de los Verdes are located inside the volcanic tube created by the eruption of the Monte Corona volcano. The tube is 6 km long, of which at least 1.5 km is located below sea surface, and is therefore called “Tunnel of Atlantis”. Situated in the tunnel’s closest section to the coast, Jameos del Agua comprises at least three holes or caves, namely:

- Jameo Chico (which gives access to the inside part)
- Jameo Grande
- Jameo la Cazuela

== Architectural intervention ==
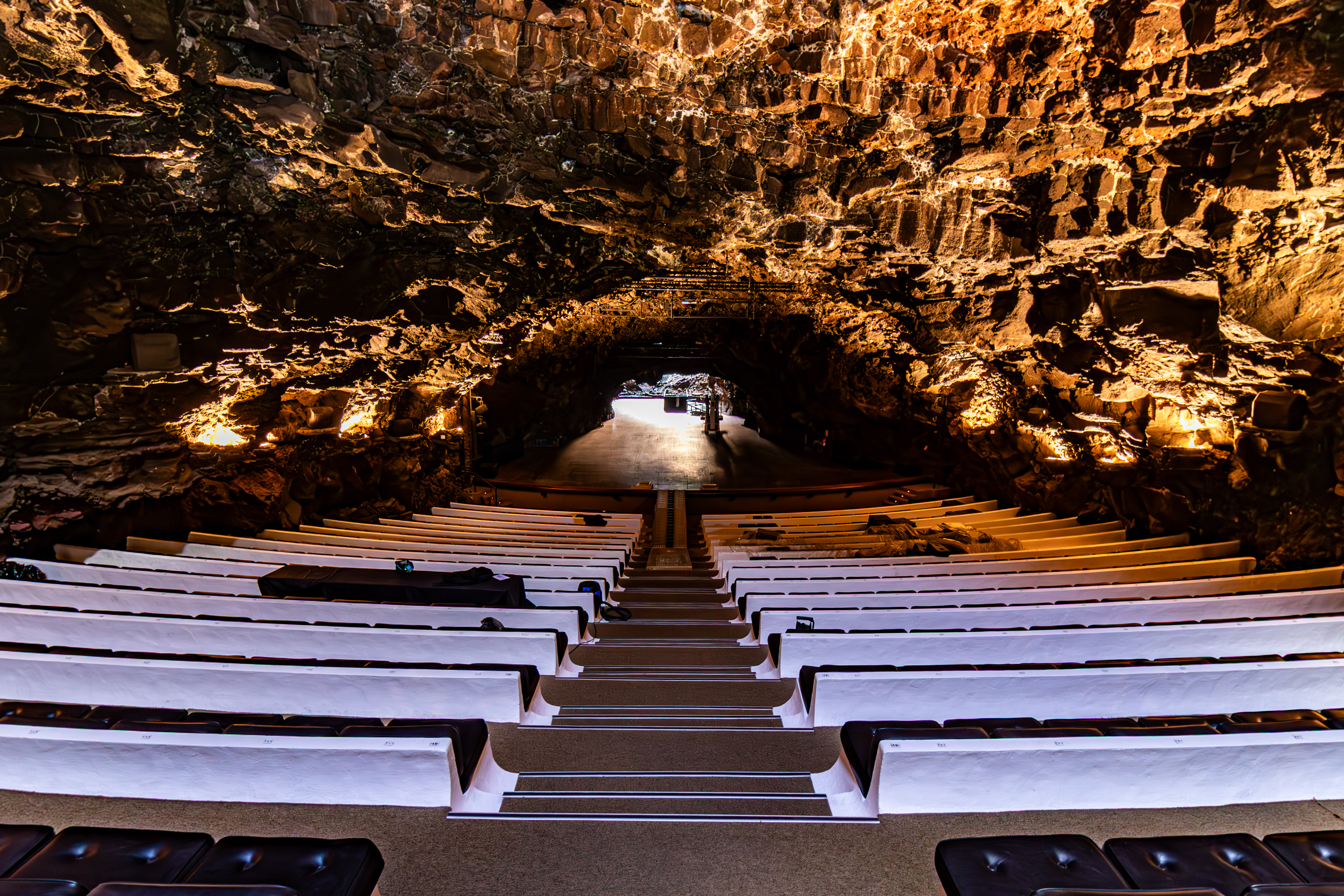
Jameos del Agua auditorium

This includes a spatial intervention in the large openings (“jameos”), executed by local artist César Manrique. The idea is to offer visitors a place to contemplate a natural attraction formed nearly without human intervention. It’s the first center of art, culture and tourism created by César Manrique, and it reflects one of his pillars of creativity: Nature and artistic creation in harmony. Restoration and cleaning of the abandoned site was necessary in the early sixties. Despite delays over the course of time, the year 1966 marked the opening of the first public areas. The initial project underwent multiple changes due to the volcanic tube’s special morphology. Those adjustments aimed to explore new creative alternatives and adopt adequate solutions. After completion of Jameos del Agua’s general structure in 1977, the center was officially opened, including the auditorium. Afterwards however, new facilities were added for specific purposes, such as the museum, called “Casa de los Volcanes”. Since 1987, the center is devoted to science and volcanology.

== Blind lobster ==
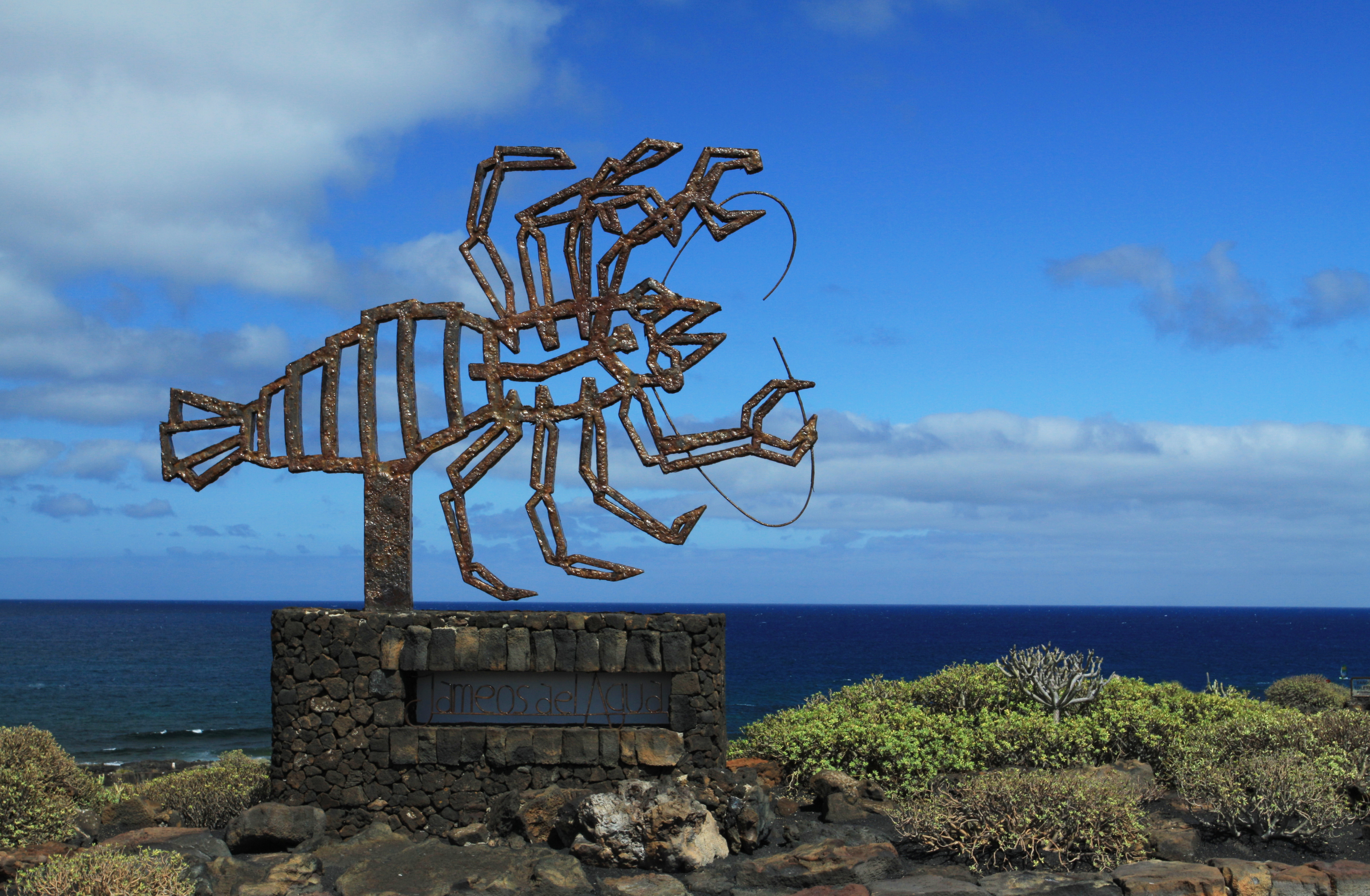
Lobster statue

Jameos del Agua is ecologically important as it is home to a unique and endemic species of squat lobster: The blind lobster Munidopsis polymorpha, a yellow-white and blind crustacean that is hardly one centimeter in length. These squat lobsters are very sensitive to changes in the lagoon (derived from sea water), including effects regarding noise and light. They are also very sensitive to oxide, which can even kill them, and therefore, it is forbidden to throw coins in the water.

== Protection ==
Monte Corona is a natural monument, and it was identified as a site of scientific interest on 19 December 1994. It’s also considered as an ecologically fragile area.

== See also ==
- Timanfaya National Park
