= City of Dreams =

City of Dreams may refer to:

== Films ==
- City of Dreams, a 2023 drama thriller film

== Casinos ==
- City of Dreams Macau, in Cotai, Macau, China
- City of Dreams Manila, in Entertainment City, Metro Manila, Philippines
- City of Dreams Mediterranean, in Zakaki, Limassol, Cyprus
- City of Dreams Sri Lanka, in Colombo, Sri Lanka

== Literature ==
- City of Dreams (novel), a 2001 historical novel by Beverly Swerling
- City of Dreams, a 2010 historical novel by William Martin
- City of Dreams (short story collection), a 2015 short-story collection by Pranaya SJB Rana
- City of Dreams, a 2023 novel by Don Winslow

== Music ==
- City of Dreams, an album by Chico Pinheiro, 2020
- "City of Dreams" (Dirty South and Alesso song), 2013
- "City of Dreams" (Joel Turner song), 2007
- "City of Dreams", a song by Talking Heads from True Stories, 1986

== Cities with the nickname ==
- Richmond, Virginia, USA
- Mumbai, Maharashtra, India

== Other uses ==
- City of Dreams (TV series), a 2019 Indian drama series

== See also ==
- Dream City (disambiguation)
