= Dorotea de Armas =

Spanish women ceramist

Dorotea de Armas Curbelo (6 February 1899 – 17 June 1997) was a Spanish ceramist who was known for introducing traditional Canary Island aboriginal figurines in the iconography of her pottery works.

== Life ==
Dorotea was born on 6 February 1899 in Muñique, a small village next to Tinajo in Lanzarote, and died on 17 June 1997. She received her training as a potter from her mother. She started modeling clay and making different objects as a child at the age of 12. She also learned from her mother how to select the clay and how to work it to make different shapes.

She continued the profession of her mother and grandmother as a potter, traditionally known as locera, specializing in ceramic works that incorporate the traditions of the Canary Islands. She took up the pottery heritage of El Mojón, where this craft of locera has a long tradition and is recognized as the village that best represents the pottery of Lanzarote.

== Works ==
Robert Verneau, in a work published in 1891, where he recounts the five years of stay that this author spent in the Canary archipelago (1876–1877 and 1884–1887), is the first researcher to address the subject of the ceramics of Lanzarote. He acquired a complete collection of typical traditional pottery of Lanzarote that he later donated to the Musée de l'Homme in Paris, France. The first archaeological study of this collection is due to the French researcher Denise Robert. Robert describes these ceramics as "popular", of rural origin, made by women in villages in the interior of the Canary islands, mainly for daily, common and domestic use, both for fetching water and for preparing and serving family meals (pots, trays, bowls, plates, etc.), used by peasants and city dwellers. In the 1970s, archaeologist González Antón studied the traditional pottery of the Canary Islands. Describing the ceramic production of El Mojón, he highlighted the work of Dorotea de Armas, the only remaining potter in Muñique, and her animal figures, such as camels, as well as human figures called novios. Later studies also mentioned the work of de Armas.

The production of Dorotea is a prime example of this traditional rural pottery. Her search for the origins of the island's pottery led her to discover the ceramic figurines used by the aborigines of the Canary Islands in their rituals and daily life. She would select the clay and keep it moist enough to make it flexible enough to add black volcanic sand, which would allow her to shape it. After shaping the piece, she baked it in fire pits next to her house in Camino de las Montañetas. The 1990 documentary "Lanzarote – Isla de los Volcanes", produced by Geoffrey Perfect, shows the creative and production process of de Armas.

She produced pottery for domestic use, toys and, most innovatively, idolillos, which reinterpreted the traditional Canarian idolillos. Figurines, such as the three-legged camels, along with figures such as the bride and groom, reinterpret the typical figures of the Guanches, the native inhabitants of the Canary Islands. Among the latter, Los Novios del Mojón stand out, which brought her fame beyond the Canary Islands.

De Armas stands out for her craftsmanship and traditional pottery modeling. De Armas' work is appreciated by admirers of this Lanzarote tradition as a renovator of the potter's craft, incorporating into her work the traditional forms of the island's aboriginal inhabitants, from before the arrival of Europeans to the islands.

De Armas received several awards for her work during her lifetime, and also posthumously as the appointment of Artisan of the Year 2017, by the Cabildo insular de Gran Canaria. She passed on her knowledge to many people who have continued her work, including her granddaughter Maria Dolores de Armas and her son Juan Jesús Brito Paz. Among her students is Juan Brito Martin, another self-taught ceramist from Lanzarote, who has used Los Novios del Mojón as a reference in many of his creations. In 2022, the Cabildo of Lanzarote paid tribute in Mancha Blanca to Dorotea de Armas with the inauguration of the sculpture "Homenaje a la artesana doña Dorotea", a work by local artist Rigoberto Camacho Pérez.

== Notable work ==
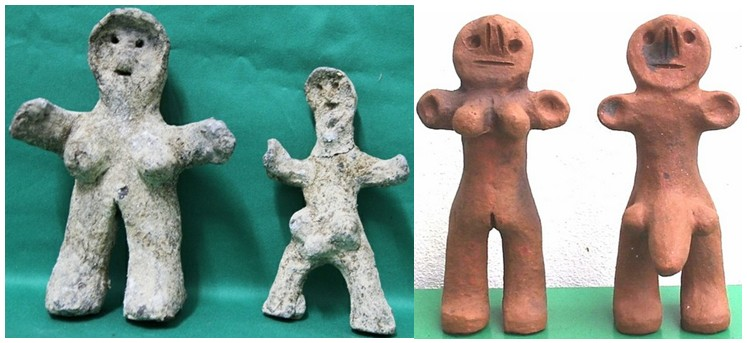
The traditional clay figurines Novios del Volcán created by Dorotea de Armas can still be found today in tourist shops.

One of the most representative works of De Armas is the Novios del Mojón, also known as Muñecos or Novios del Volcán, as De Armas calls them. They are two clay figurines representing a man and a woman, with an exaggerated representation of their sexual attributes, inspired by archaeological artifacts found in sites from the island's pre-Hispanic period. According to tradition, during betrothal ceremonies, men offered the male figure to offer it to their fiancées, and if the engagement was accepted, women responded by giving a female figurine.

José Saramago's novel A Caverna was inspired by the clay figurines created by De Armas.
