= Lanzarote =

Canary Island

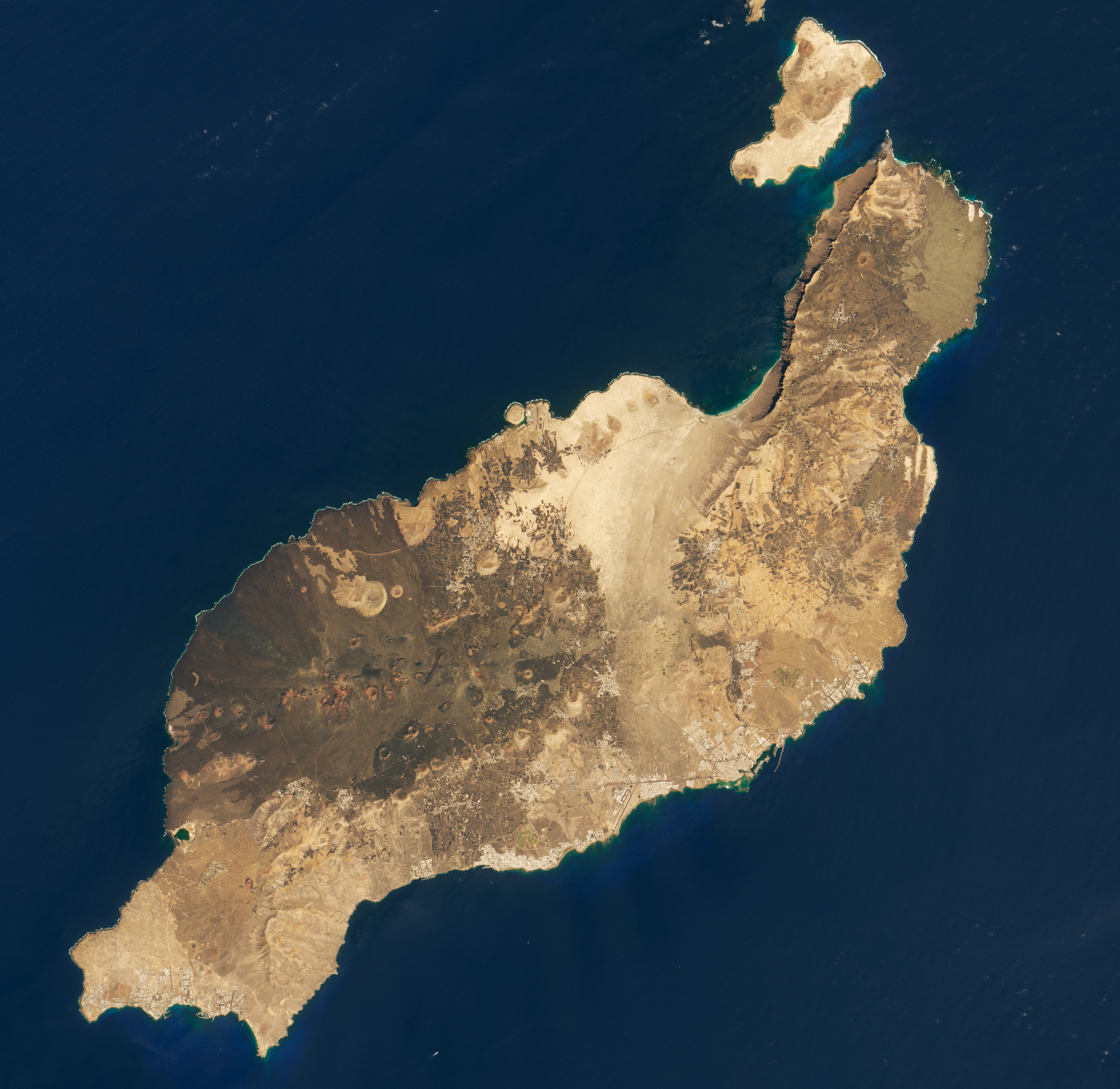
- Satellite view (October 2019)

- Location in the Canary Islands

- Location in Spain

Geography
- Coordinates: 29.035°N 13.635°W
- Archipelago: Canary Islands
- Area: 845.94 km^{2} (326.62 sq mi)
- Coastline: 191 km (118.7 mi)
- Highest elevation: 671 m (2201 ft)
- Highest point: Peñas del Chache

Administration
- Spain
- Autonomous community: Canary Islands
- Province: Las Palmas
- Capital and largest city: Arrecife (pop. 68025)
- President of the cabildo insular: María Dolores Corujo Berriel

Demographics
- Demonym: lanzaroteño, -ña; conejero, -a (es)
- Population: 166878 (2025)
- Pop. density: 180.0/km^{2} (466.2/sq mi)
- Languages: Spanish
- Ethnic groups: Spanish other minority groups

Additional information
- Time zone: WET (UTC±00:00)
  - Summer (DST): WEST (UTC+01:00)

Lanzarote (UK: /ˌlænzəˈrɒti/, US: /-ˈroʊteɪ/, Spanish: [lanθaˈɾote], locally [lansaˈɾote]) is a Spanish island, the easternmost of the Canary Islands, 125 kilometres (80 miles) off the north coast of Africa and 1,000 kilometres (600 miles) from the Iberian Peninsula.

Covering 845.94 square kilometres (326.62 square miles), Lanzarote is the fourth-largest of the islands in the archipelago. With 163,230 inhabitants at the beginning of 2024, it is the third most populous Canary Island, after Tenerife and Gran Canaria. Located in the centre-west of the island is Timanfaya National Park, one of its main attractions. The island was declared a biosphere reserve by UNESCO in 1993. The island's capital is Arrecife, which lies on the eastern coastline. It is the smaller main island of the Province of Las Palmas.

The first recorded name for the island, given by Italian-Majorcan cartographer Angelino Dulcert, was Insula de Lanzarotus Marocelus, after the Genoese navigator Lancelotto Malocello, from which the modern name is derived. The island's name in the native Guanche language was Tyterogaka or Tytheroygaka, which may mean "one that is all ochre" (referring to the island's predominant colour previous to the Timanfaya eruption).

== History ==
Flag of Lanzarote

Lanzarote is believed to have been the first Canary Island to be settled. The Phoenicians may have visited or settled there, though no material evidence survives. The first known record came from Roman author Pliny the Elder in the encyclopaedia Naturalis Historia on an expedition to the Canary Islands. The names of the islands (then called Insulae Fortunatae or the "Fortunate Isles") were recorded as Junonia (Fuerteventura), Canaria (Gran Canaria), Ninguaria (Tenerife), Junonia Major (La Palma), Pluvialia (El Hierro), and Capraria (La Gomera). Lanzarote and Fuerteventura, the two easternmost Canary Islands, were only mentioned as the archipelago of the "purple islands". The Roman poet Lucan and the Greek astronomer and geographer Ptolemy gave their precise locations. It was settled by the Majos tribe of the Guanches. After the fall of the Western Roman Empire, interaction with the Canary Islands is unrecorded before 999, when the Arabs arrived at the island which they dubbed al-Djezir al-Khalida (among other names).

In 1336, a ship arrived from Lisbon under the guidance of Genoese navigator Lancelotto Malocello, who used the alias "Lanzarote da Framqua". A fort was later built in the area of Montaña de Guanapay near today's Teguise. Castilian slaving expeditions in 1385 and 1393 seized hundreds of Guanches and sold them in Spain, initiating the slave trade in the islands. French explorer Jean de Béthencourt arrived in 1402, heading a private expedition under Castilian auspices. Bethencourt first visited the south of Lanzarote at Playas de Papagayo, and the French overran the island within a matter of months. The island lacked mountains and gorges to serve as hideouts for the remaining Guanche population, and so many Guanches were taken away as slaves that only 300 Guanche men were said to have remained.

At the southern end of the Yaiza municipality, the first European settlement in the Canary Islands appeared in 1402 in the area known as El Rubicón, where the conquest of the Archipelago began. In this place, the Cathedral of Saint Martial of Limoges was built. The cathedral was destroyed by English pirates in the 16th century. A diocese was moved in 1483 to Las Palmas de Gran Canaria (Roman Catholic Diocese of Canarias). In 1404, the Castilians (with the support of the King of Castile) came and fought the local Guanches, who were further decimated. The islands of Fuerteventura and El Hierro were later similarly conquered. In 1477, a decision by the royal council of Castile confirmed a grant of Lanzarote and Fuerteventura, with the smaller islands of Ferro and Gomera to the Castilian nobles Herrera, who held their fief until the end of the 18th century. In 1586, the Ottoman admiral Murat Reis temporarily seized Lanzarote. In the 17th century, pirates raided the island and took 1,000 inhabitants into slavery in Cueva de los Verdes.

Lanzarote and Fuerteventura would be the main exporters of wheat and cereals to the central islands of the archipelago during the 16th, 17th and 18th centuries; Tenerife and Gran Canaria. Although this trade was almost never reversed for the inhabitants of Lanzarote and Fuerteventura (due to the fact that the landowners of these islands profited from this activity), producing periods of famine, so the population of these islands had to travel to Tenerife and Gran Canaria. The island of Tenerife is a major focus of attraction for the inhabitants of Lanzarote and Fuerteventura, hence the feeling of union that has always existed in the popular sphere with Tenerife.

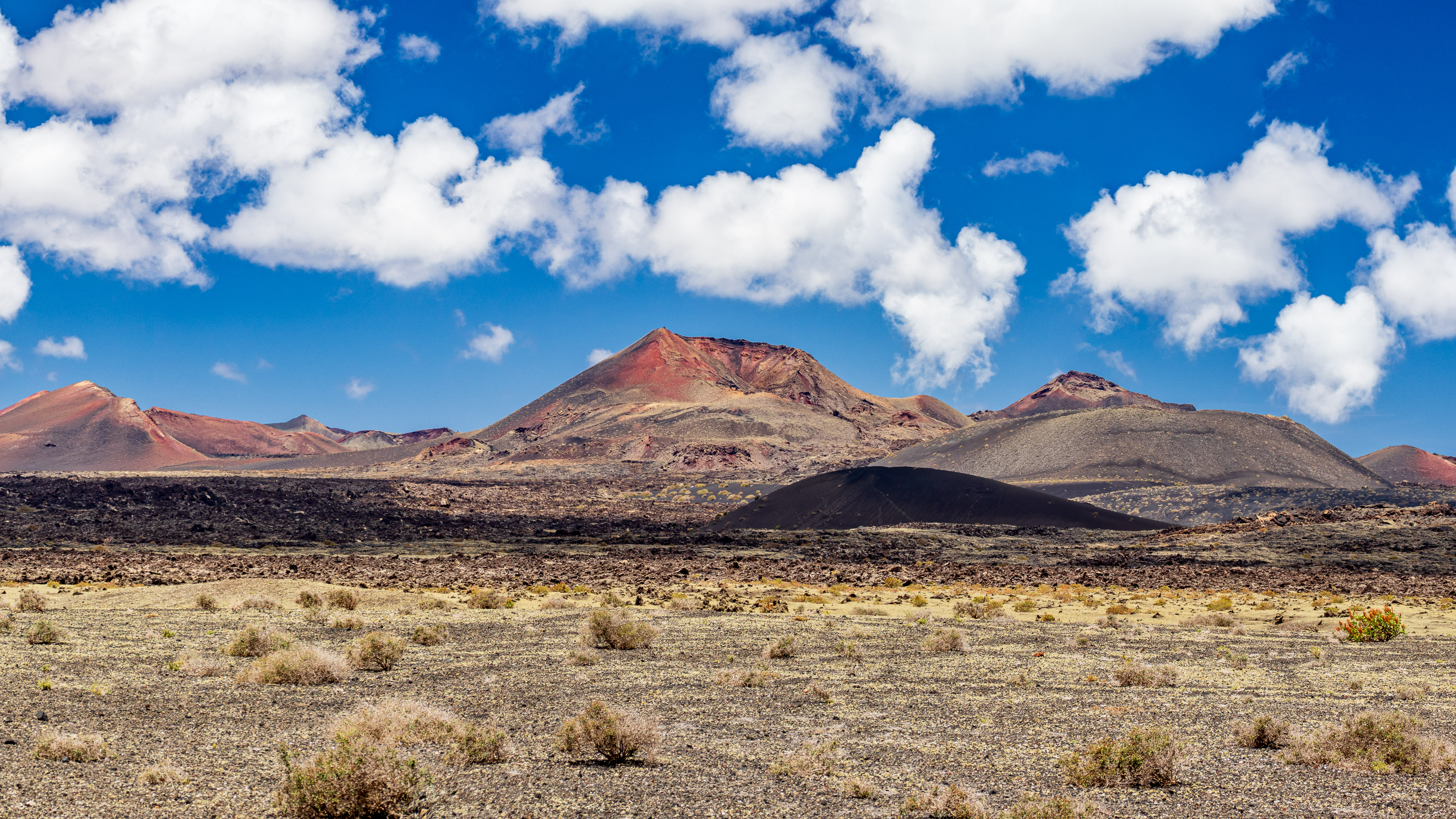
Lava and pyroclast-covered fields in the central part of Lanzarote, with volcanoes from the 1730-1736 eruption in the background.

From 1730 to 1736, the island was hit by a series of volcanic eruptions, producing 32 new volcanoes in a stretch of 18 kilometres (11 miles). The priest of Yaiza, Don Andrés Lorenzo Curbelo, documented the eruption in detail until 1731. Lava covered a quarter of the island's surface, including the most fertile soil and 11 villages. 100 smaller volcanoes were located in the area called Montañas del Fuego, the "Mountains of Fire". In 1768, drought affected the deforested island, and winter rains did not fall. Much of the population was forced to emigrate to Cuba and the Americas, including a group which formed a significant addition to the Spanish settlers in Texas at San Antonio de Bexar in 1731.

In 1927, Lanzarote and Fuerteventura became part of the province of Las Palmas. Several archaeological expeditions have uncovered the prehistoric settlement at the archaeologic site of El Bebedero in the village of Teguise. In one of those expeditions, by a team from the University of Las Palmas de Gran Canaria and a team from the University of Zaragoza, yielded about 100 Roman potsherds, nine pieces of metal, and one piece of glass. The artefacts were found in strata dated between the 1st and 4th centuries. They show that Romans did trade with the Canarians, though there is no evidence of settlements.

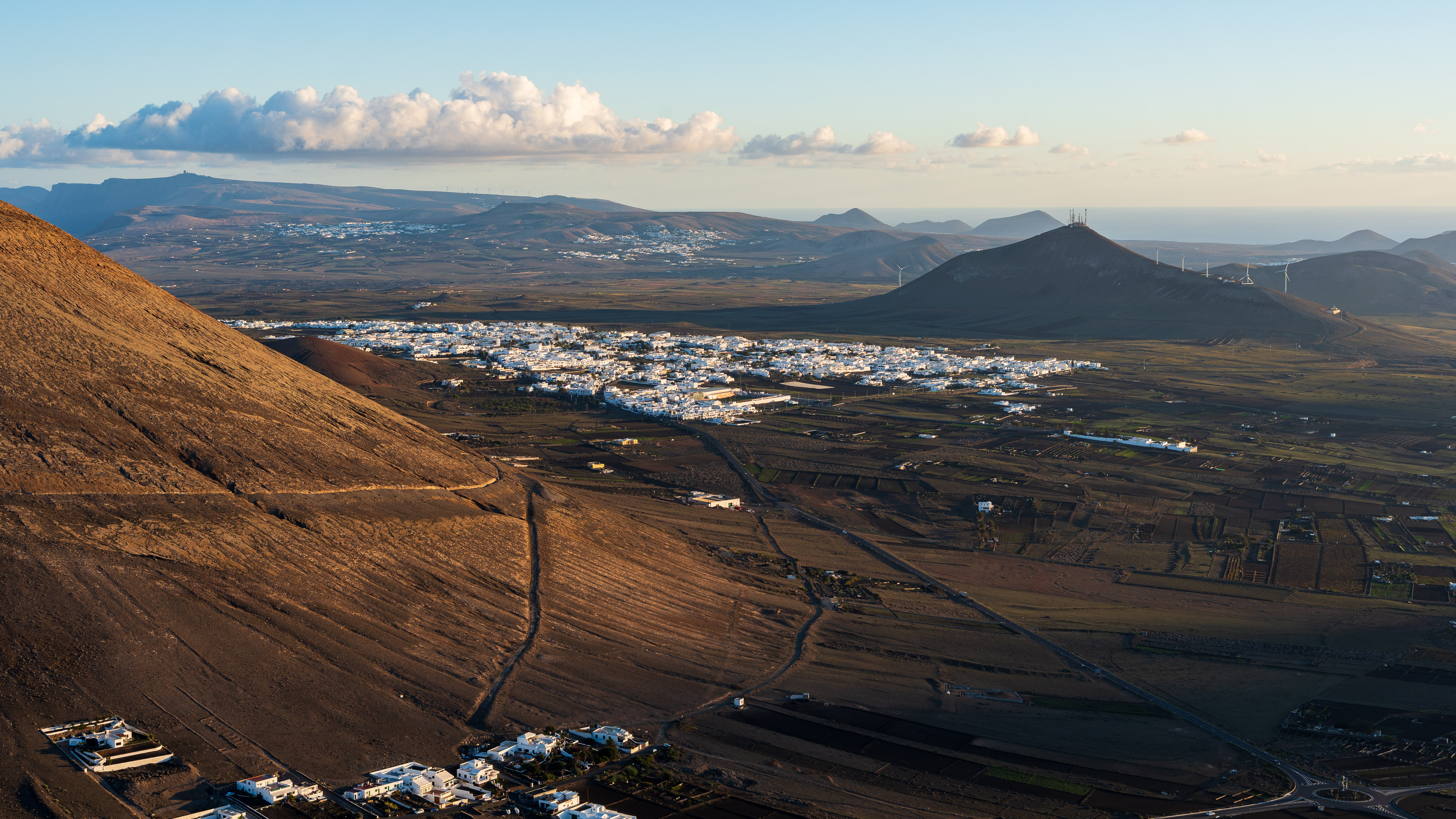
Characteristic white houses of the towns and villages on the volcanic landscape of Lanzarote.

The island has a UNESCO Biosphere Reserve protected site status. According to a report in the Financial Times, this status was endangered by a local corruption scandal. Since May 2009, police have arrested the former president of Lanzarote, the former mayor of Arrecife and more than 20 politicians and businessmen in connection with illegal building permits along Lanzarote's coastline. UNESCO has threatened to revoke Lanzarote's Biosphere Reserve status, "if the developments are not respecting local needs and are impacting on the environment". The President of the Cabildo of Lanzarote denied "any threat to Lanzarote's UNESCO status".

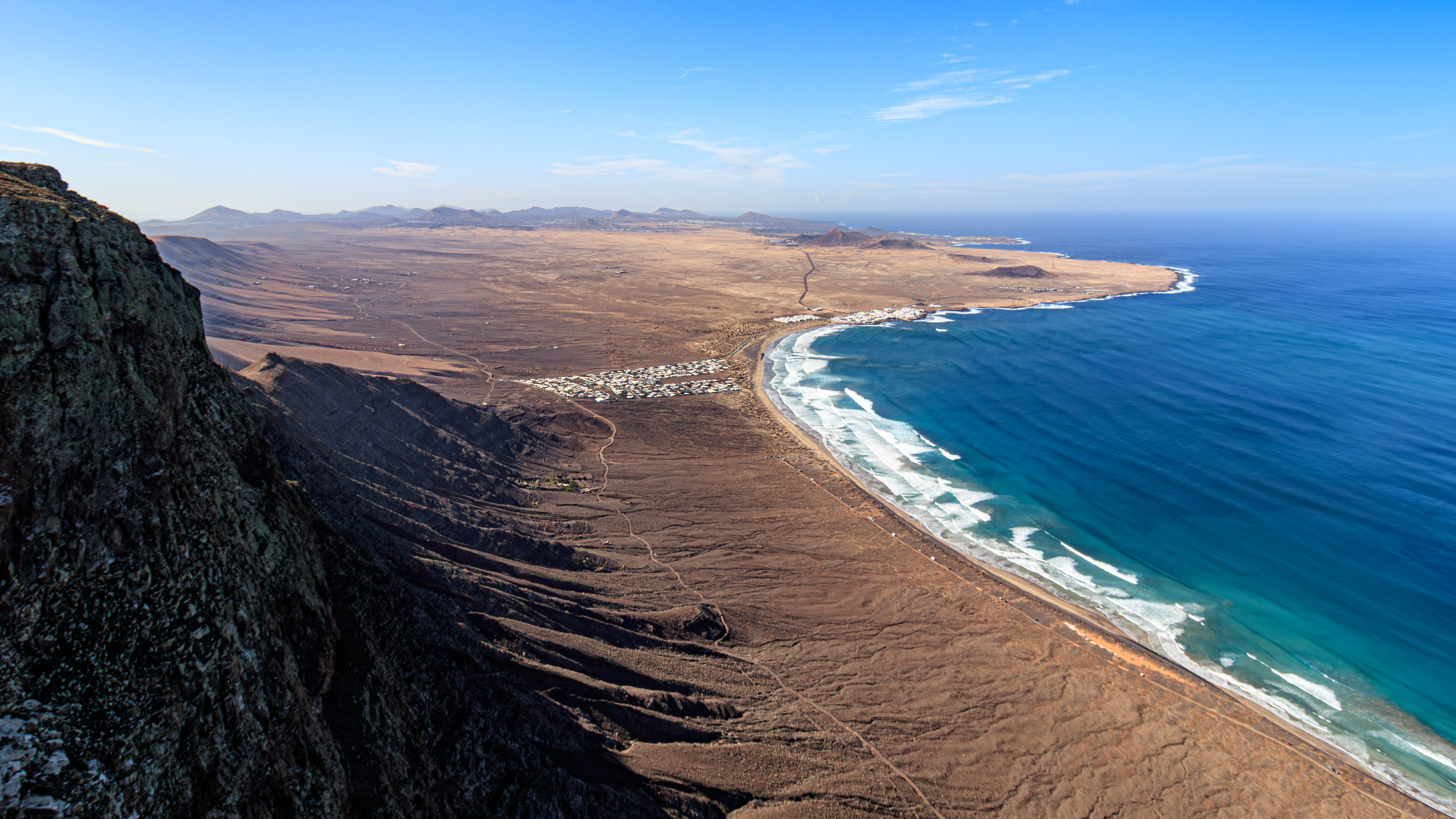
The El Jable area and Famara Beach seen from the Famara cliffs in the northwest part of Lanzarote.

== Geography ==
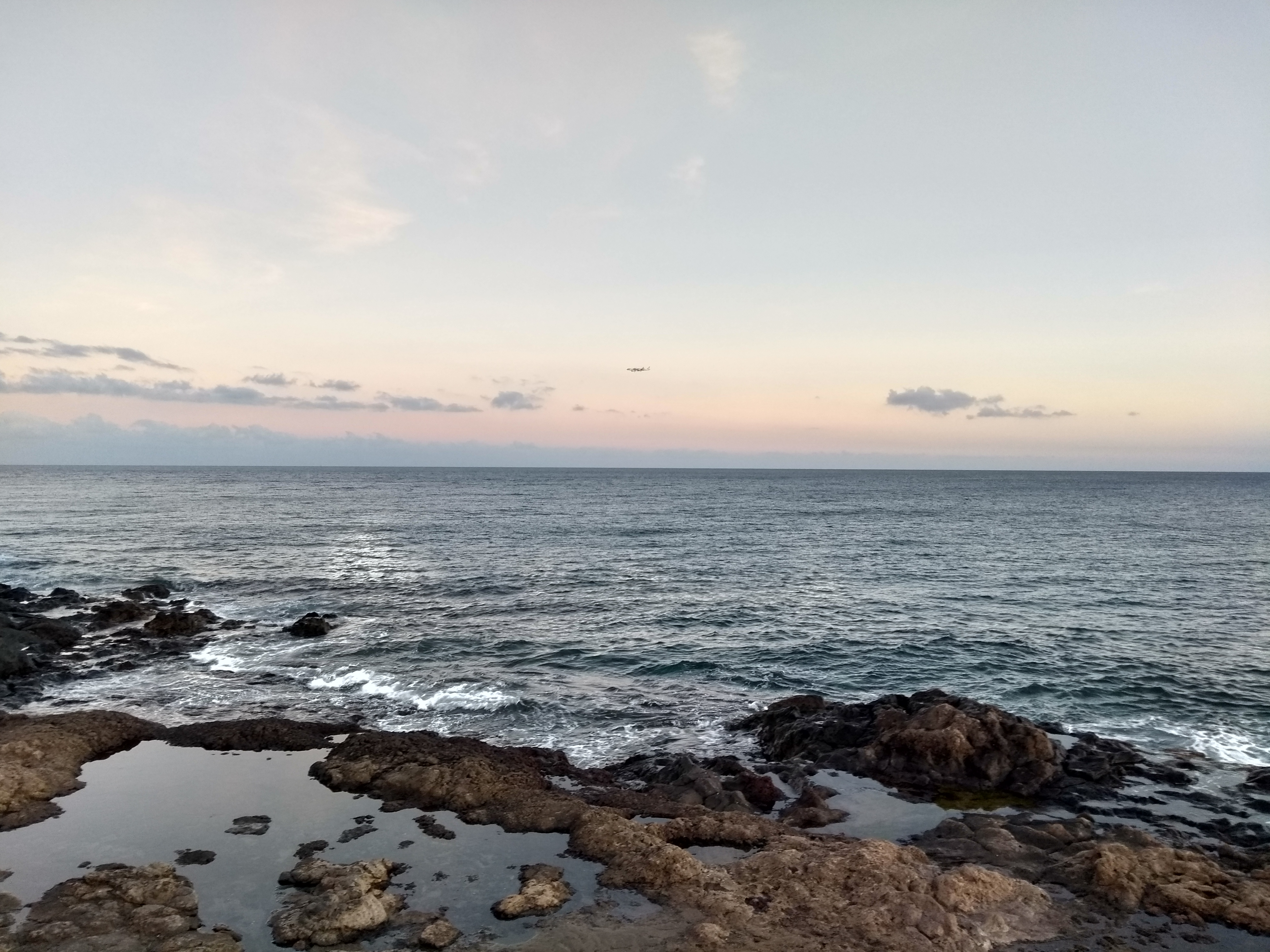
Atlantic Ocean at Los Picollos, Lanzarote

Lanzarote is located 125 kilometres (80 miles) north-west of Africa, 11 km (7 mi) north-east of Fuerteventura and just over 1 km (5/8 mi) from La Graciosa. The dimensions of the island are 60 km (37 mi) from north to south and 25 km (16 mi) from west to east. Lanzarote has 213 kilometres (132 miles) of coastline, of which 10 km (6 mi) are sand, 16.5 km (10 1/4 mi) are beach, and the remainder is rocky. Its landscape includes the mountain ranges of Famara (671 metres or 2,201 feet) in the north and Ajaches (608 metres or 1,995 feet) to the south. South of the Famara massif is the El Jable desert, which separates Famara and Montañas del Fuego. The highest peak is Peñas del Chache, rising to 670 metres (2,200 feet) above sea level. The "Tunnel of Atlantis", the largest underwater volcanic tunnel in the world, is part of the Cueva de los Verdes lava tube.

=== Climate ===
Often called the "Island of Eternal Spring", Lanzarote has a subtropical hot desert climate (BWh) according to the Köppen climatic classification. The small amount of precipitation is mainly concentrated in the winter. Rainfall during summer is a rare phenomenon and very often summers are completely dry without any precipitation. On average the island receives approximately 16 days of precipitation between December and February. Sometimes, the hot sirocco wind prevails, causing dry and dusty conditions across the island. Average precipitation in June and August is less than 0.5 millimetres (0.020 inches).

Climate data for Lanzarote Airport (1991–2020 normals)
Month	Jan	Feb	Mar	Apr	May	Jun	Jul	Aug	Sep	Oct	Nov	Dec	Year
Mean daily maximum °C (°F)	21.7 (71.1)	22.2 (72.0)	23.6 (74.5)	24.4 (75.9)	25.8 (78.4)	27.3 (81.1)	28.9 (84.0)	29.9 (85.8)	29.0 (84.2)	27.5 (81.5)	24.9 (76.8)	22.7 (72.9)	25.7 (78.3)
Daily mean °C (°F)	17.6 (63.7)	18.0 (64.4)	19.1 (66.4)	20.0 (68.0)	21.3 (70.3)	23.0 (73.4)	24.4 (75.9)	25.5 (77.9)	24.8 (76.6)	23.3 (73.9)	20.9 (69.6)	18.8 (65.8)	21.4 (70.5)
Mean daily minimum °C (°F)	13.6 (56.5)	13.8 (56.8)	14.6 (58.3)	15.5 (59.9)	16.9 (62.4)	18.7 (65.7)	20.2 (68.4)	21.0 (69.8)	20.5 (68.9)	19.1 (66.4)	16.8 (62.2)	14.9 (58.8)	17.1 (62.8)
Average precipitation mm (inches)	15.4 (0.61)	16.1 (0.63)	10.9 (0.43)	4.1 (0.16)	1.2 (0.05)	0.1 (0.00)	0.0 (0.0)	0.5 (0.02)	1.8 (0.07)	12.8 (0.50)	15.5 (0.61)	21.4 (0.84)	99.8 (3.93)
Average precipitation days (≥ 1.0 mm)	2.8	2.5	2.2	0.9	0.3	trace	0.0	0.1	0.4	2.1	3.0	3.2	17.5
Average relative humidity (%)	68.0	67.6	67.1	66.2	66.1	67.0	67.8	68.7	70.6	70.6	69.0	70.2	68.2
Mean monthly sunshine hours	212.5	208.5	256.6	264.8	300.0	297.3	320.3	309.1	267.1	240.3	208.4	207.7	3,092.6
Source: NOAA/NCEI

Climate data for Lanzarote Airport (altitude 14m, 1981–2010 normals, extremes 1972–present)
Month	Jan	Feb	Mar	Apr	May	Jun	Jul	Aug	Sep	Oct	Nov	Dec	Year
Record high °C (°F)	27.9 (82.2)	29.4 (84.9)	34.4 (93.9)	36.3 (97.3)	42.6 (108.7)	40.7 (105.3)	43.4 (110.1)	43.6 (110.5)	40.5 (104.9)	37.3 (99.1)	34.2 (93.6)	27.5 (81.5)	43.6 (110.5)
Mean daily maximum °C (°F)	20.7 (69.3)	21.3 (70.3)	22.9 (73.2)	23.5 (74.3)	24.6 (76.3)	26.3 (79.3)	28.2 (82.8)	29.1 (84.4)	28.6 (83.5)	26.7 (80.1)	24.2 (75.6)	21.8 (71.2)	24.8 (76.6)
Daily mean °C (°F)	17.4 (63.3)	17.9 (64.2)	19.0 (66.2)	19.6 (67.3)	20.8 (69.4)	22.6 (72.7)	24.3 (75.7)	25.2 (77.4)	24.7 (76.5)	23.0 (73.4)	20.7 (69.3)	18.6 (65.5)	21.1 (70.0)
Mean daily minimum °C (°F)	14.0 (57.2)	14.3 (57.7)	15.0 (59.0)	15.7 (60.3)	16.8 (62.2)	18.8 (65.8)	20.4 (68.7)	21.2 (70.2)	20.8 (69.4)	19.4 (66.9)	17.2 (63.0)	15.4 (59.7)	17.4 (63.3)
Record low °C (°F)	8.0 (46.4)	7.6 (45.7)	8.3 (46.9)	9.5 (49.1)	11.5 (52.7)	12.4 (54.3)	15.4 (59.7)	16.6 (61.9)	15.5 (59.9)	12.0 (53.6)	10.9 (51.6)	9.0 (48.2)	7.6 (45.7)
Average precipitation mm (inches)	16 (0.6)	18 (0.7)	12 (0.5)	5 (0.2)	2 (0.1)	0 (0)	0 (0)	trace	2 (0.1)	10 (0.4)	15 (0.6)	29 (1.1)	111 (4.4)
Average precipitation days (≥ 1.0 mm)	3.2	2.7	2.4	1.3	0.4	0.0	0.0	0.1	0.4	1.9	3.0	3.8	19.0
Average relative humidity (%)	68	68	66	66	66	66	68	68	70	71	69	71	68
Mean monthly sunshine hours	203	201	241	255	297	292	308	295	248	235	207	196	2,986
Average ultraviolet index	4	5	7	9	10	11	11	10	9	7	5	4	8
Source: Agencia Estatal de Meteorología

== Geology ==
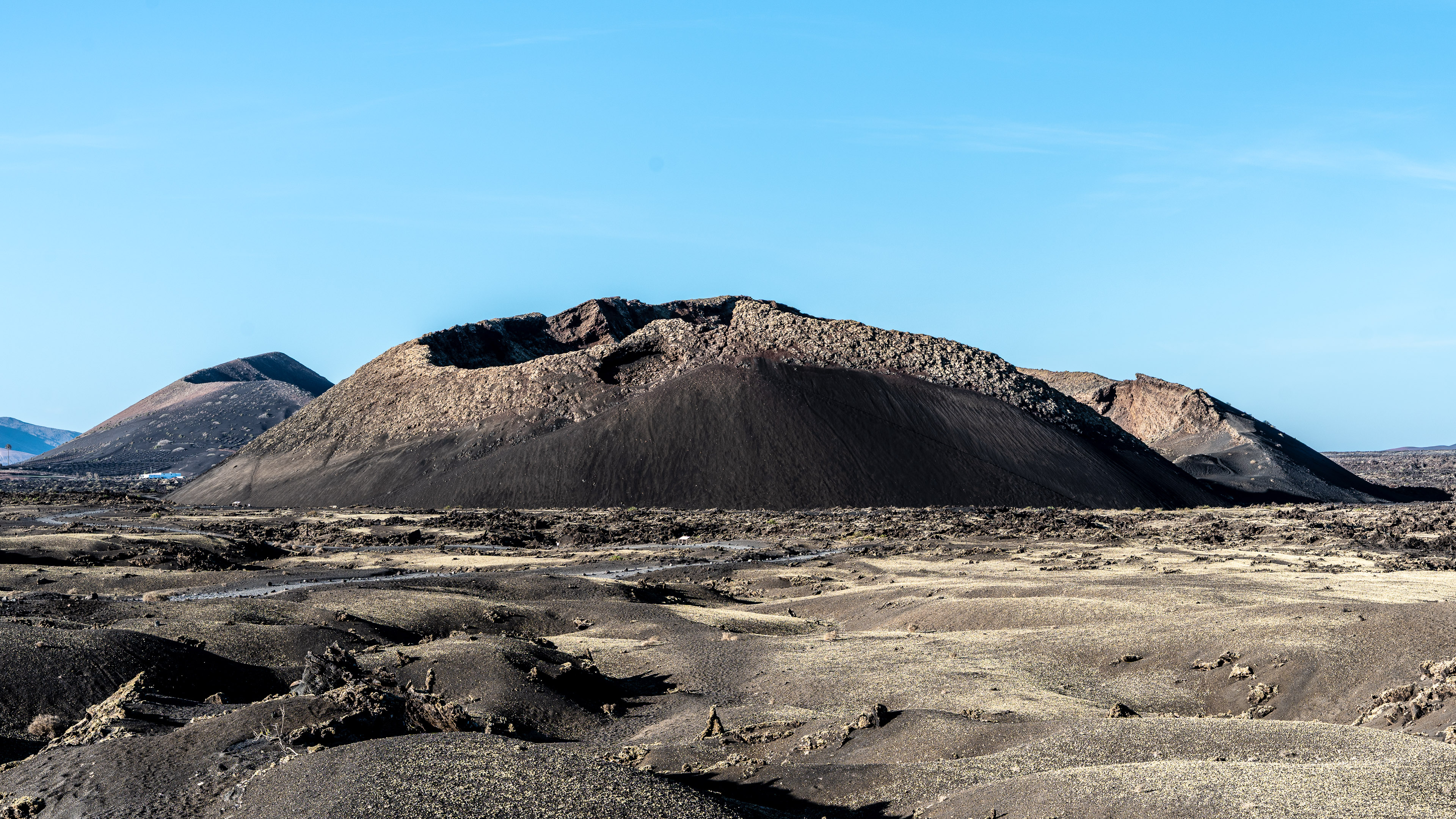
Caldera de Los Cuervos in Los Volcanes Natural Park

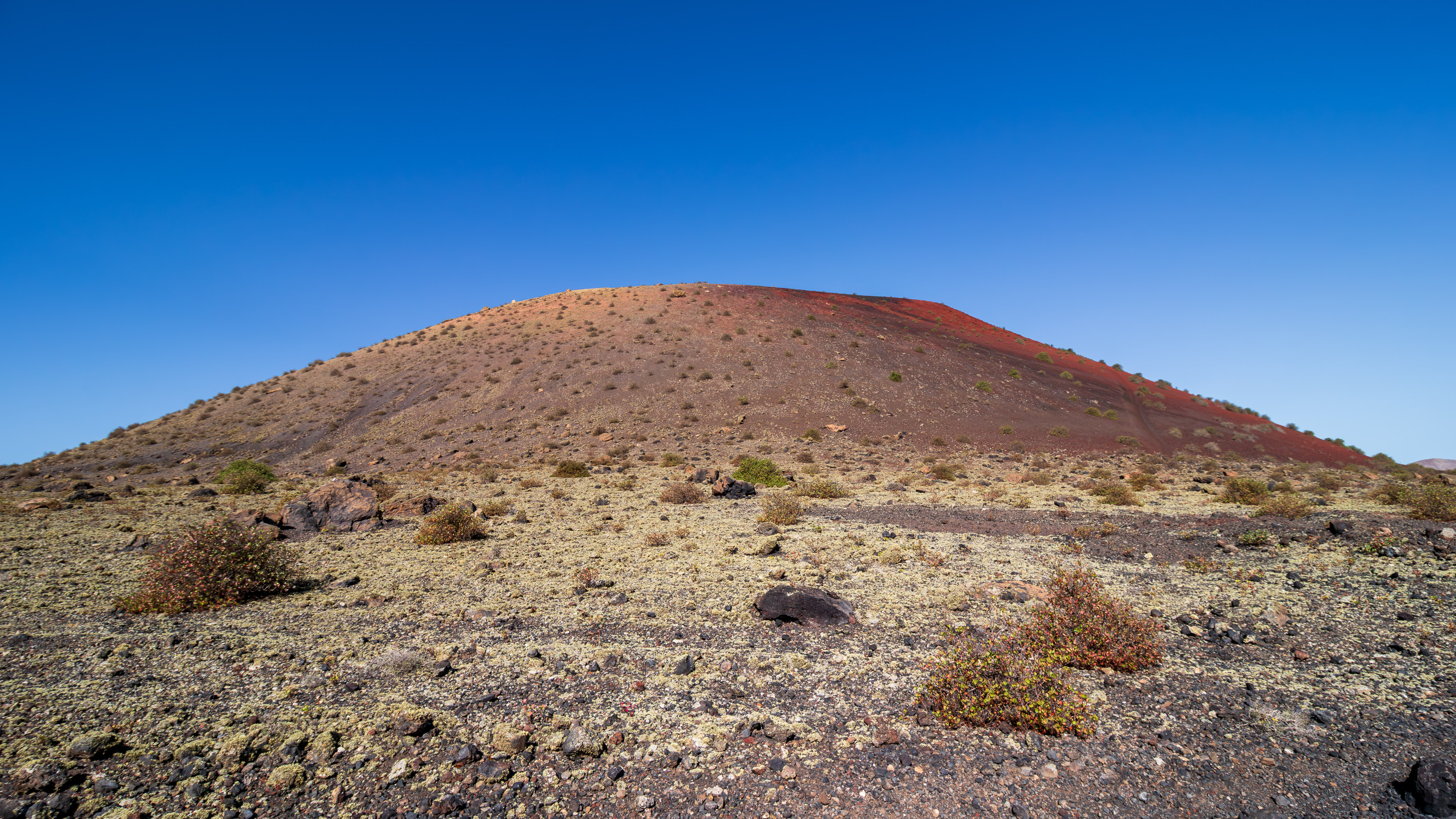
Montaña Colorada in Los Volcanes Natural Park

Lanzarote is the northernmost and easternmost island of the main Canary Islands and has a volcanic origin. The island emerged about 15 million years ago as product of the Canary hotspot. The island, along with others, emerged after the breakup of the African and the American continental plates. The greatest recorded eruptions occurred between 1730 and 1736. The eruption period started outside the Timanfaya National Park area, at Caldera de Los Cuervos volcano on 1 September 1730 and ended with the eruption of Montaña Colorada volcano, 1.7 km (1.1 mi) north-east of El Cuervo, which has ceased the activity on 16 April 1736.

== Biodiversity ==
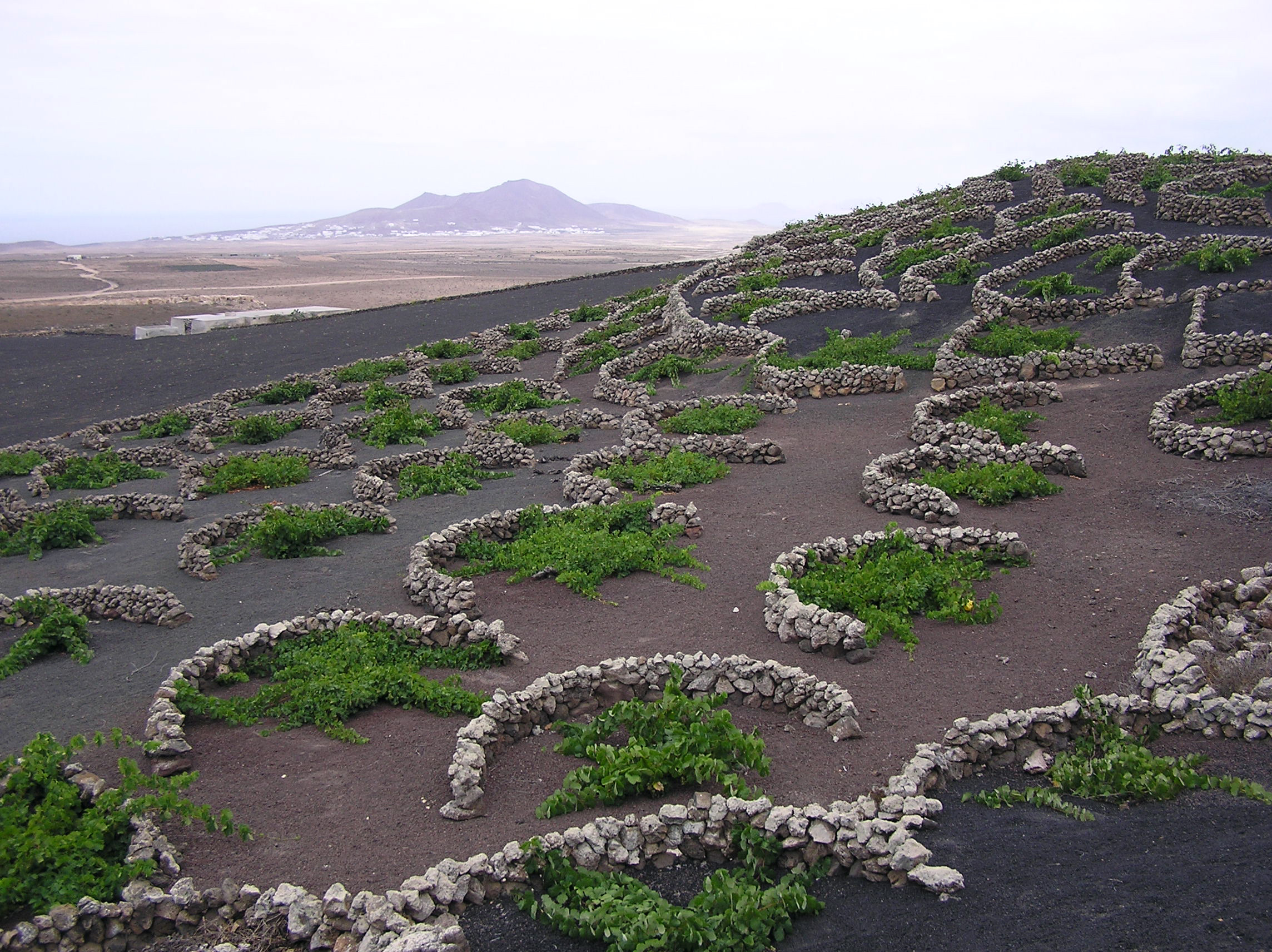
Malvasia grape vines growing in topsoil covered in lapilli, in La Geria. The low, curved walls protect the vines from the constant, drying wind.

=== Flora ===
There are five hundred different kinds of plants on the island, of which 17 species are endemic. These plants have adapted to the relative scarcity of water in the same way as succulents. They include the Canary Island date palm (Phoenix canariensis), which is found in damper areas of the north, the Canary Island pine (Pinus canariensis), ferns, and wild olive trees (Olea europaea). Laurisilva trees, which once covered the highest parts of Risco de Famara, are rarely found today. After winter rainfall, the vegetation comes to a colourful bloom between February and March.

The vineyards of La Gería, Lanzarote DO wine region, are a protected area. Single vines are planted in pits 4–5 metres (13–16 feet) wide and 2–3 metres (6 feet 7 inches – 9 feet 10 inches) deep, with small stone walls around each pit. This agricultural technique is designed to harvest rainfall and overnight dew and to protect the plants from the winds.

=== Fungi ===
There are 180 different species of lichen-forming fungi. These survive in the suitable areas like rock surfaces, and promote weathering.

=== Fauna ===
Apart from the native bats and the mammals which accompanied humans to the island (including the dromedary, which was used for agriculture and is now a tourist attraction), there are few vertebrate species on Lanzarote. These include birds (such as falcons) and reptiles. Some interesting endemic animals are the Gallotia lizards and the blind Munidopsis polymorpha crabs found in the Jameos del Agua salt lake, which was formed by a volcanic eruption. The island is also home to one of two surviving populations of the threatened Canarian Egyptian vulture.

The island was formerly inhabited by the now extinct lava mouse (Malpaisomys insularis), though the Canarian shrew (Crocidura canariensis) still inhabits the island.

== Natural symbols ==
The official natural symbols associated with Lanzarote are Munidopsis polymorpha (Blind crab) and Euphorbia balsamifera (Tabaiba dulce).

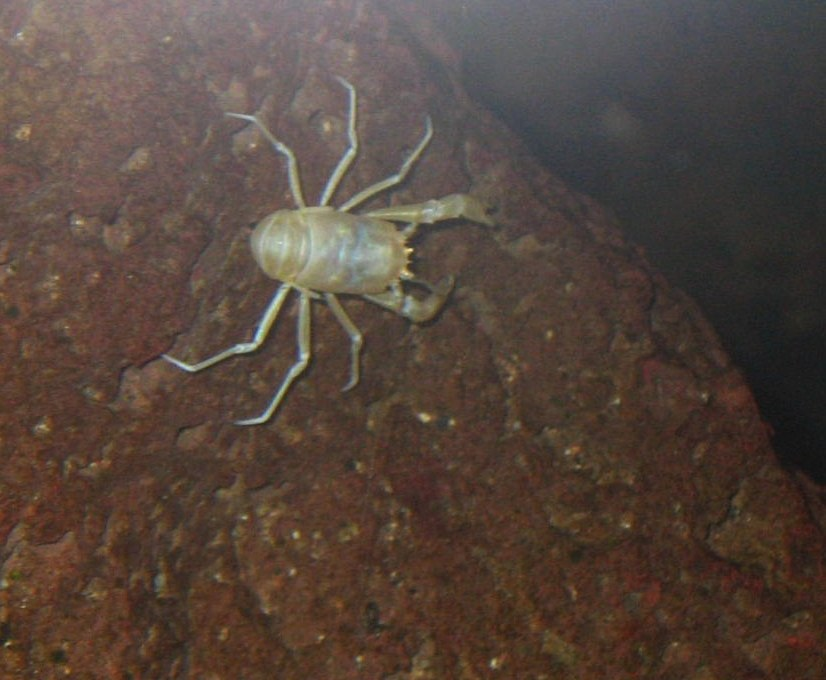
Munidopsis polymorpha

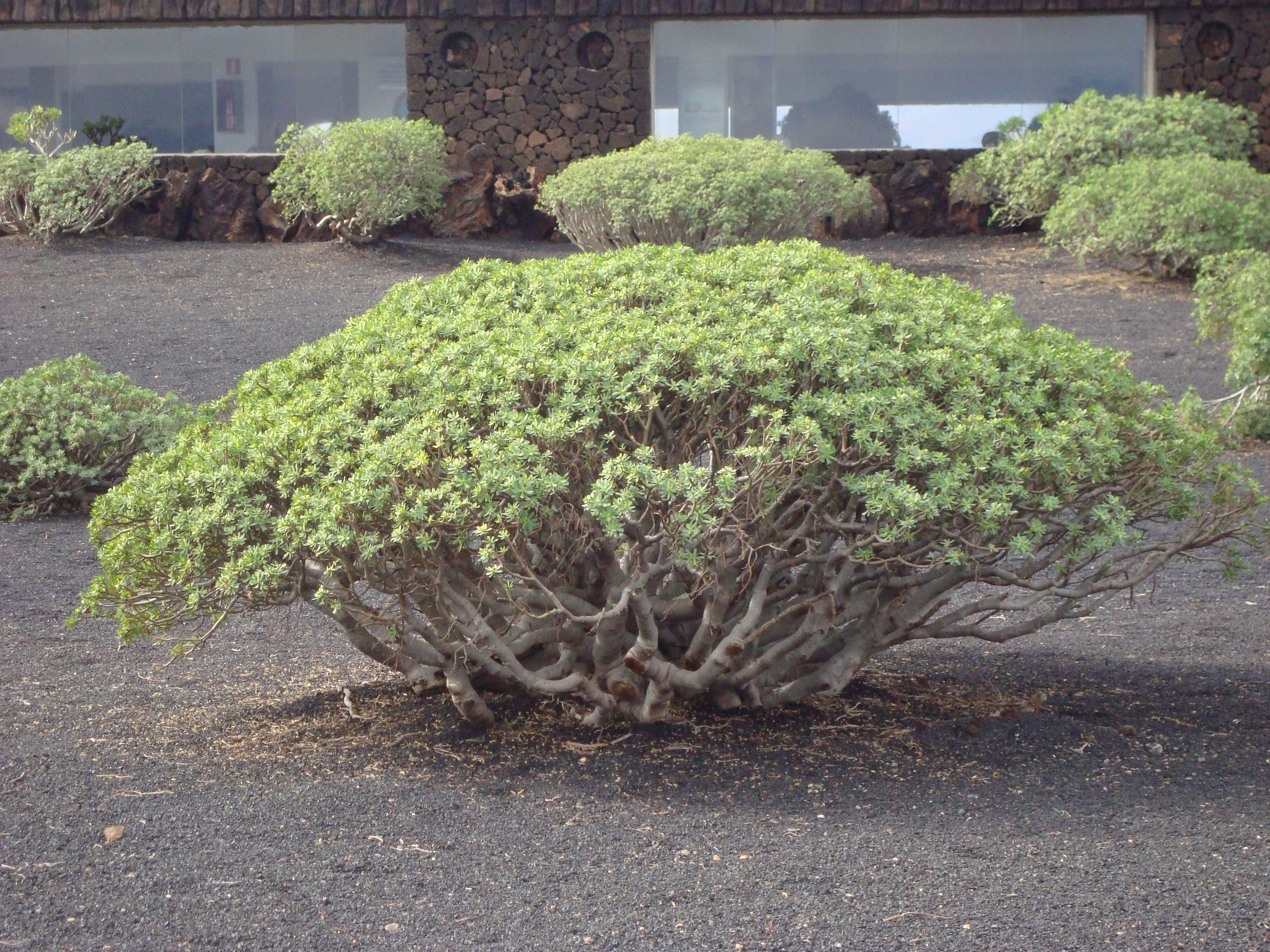
Euphorbia balsamifera

== Demographics ==
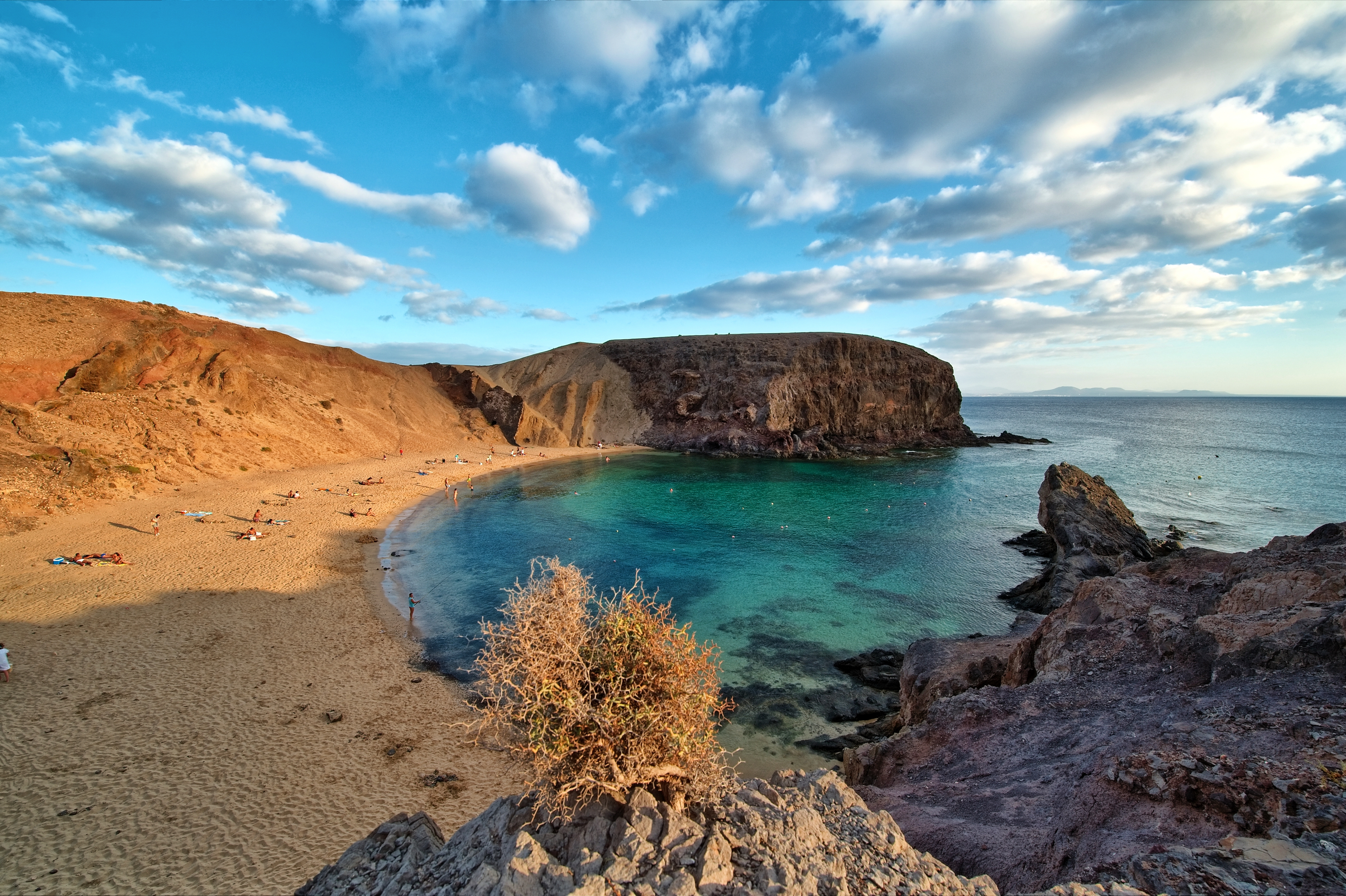
Papagayo Beach

As of 2024, 163230 people live on Lanzarote, an increase of 4.6% from the previous year (156112). The seat of the island government (Cabildo insular) is in the capital, Arrecife, which has a population of 68025 in 2024. According to the 2024 census, the majority of the inhabitants are Spanish (76.1%) with a sizeable number of residents of other nationalities, notably Colombians (4.4%), Britons (3.8%), Italians (2.6%), Moroccans (2.4%) and Germans (1.4%).

Nationality	Population	Percentage
Spanish	124174	76.1%
Colombian	7121	4.4%
British	6254	3.8%
Italian	4317	2.6%
Moroccan	3870	2.4%
German	2243	1.4%
Other nationalities	15251	9.3%

== Administration ==
Lanzarote is part of the province of Las Palmas, and is divided into seven municipalities:

Name	Area (km^{2})	Census Population			Estimated Population (2024)
Name	Area (km^{2})	2001	2011	2021	Estimated Population (2024)
Arrecife	22.72	44,980	55,381	64,278	68,025
Haría	106.59	4,027	5,054	5,395	5,590
San Bartolomé	40.89	13,030	18,118	19,305	19,664
Teguise	263.98	12,392	20,294	22,976	23,762
Tías	64.61	12,820	19,148	20,469	21,456
Tinajo	135.28	4,512	5,738	6,441	6,832
Yaiza	211.85	5,020	14,468	17,080	17,901
Totals	845.92	96,781	138,201	155,944	163,230

== Transport ==
Location of airport and ports of Lanzarote

=== Air ===
The island's main point of entry is César Manrique-Lanzarote Airport which, in 2018, handled 7327019 passengers. It was renamed in 2019 to include the name of local artist César Manrique, in honour of the legacy he left behind on the island and coinciding with the centenary of his birth. The airport has two passenger terminal buildings, T1 and T2, with T2 being used exclusively for inter-island flights to and from the other Canary Islands. These inter-island flights are operated by regional airlines Binter Canarias and Canaryfly. Lanzarote Airport is located about 5 kilometres (3.1 mi) southwest of the island's capital, Arrecife, to which it is connected by the LZ-2 road.

=== Sea ===
Most of the goods arrive by sea through the Port of Arrecife, Puerto de los Mármoles. This port is also used by cruise ships. There are regular ferry lines that connect the Port of Arrecife with Las Palmas de Gran Canaria, Santa Cruz de Tenerife and Cadiz.

Three ferry companies (Fred Olsen Express, Naviera Armas and Líneas Marítimas Romero) operate several times a day between Playa Blanca, the southernmost town on Lanzarote, and Corralejo on the northern coast of Fuerteventura. Ferries to the island of La Graciosa depart from Órzola, Lanzarote's northernmost town. The two main companies operating these services are Fred Olsen Express and Naviera Armas.

=== Road ===
The LZ-1 road connects the capital, Arrecife, to the northernmost town of Órzola. The LZ-2 road connects Arrecife to the southernmost town of Playa Blanca. LZ-3 is a highway that acts as a ring road around Arrecife, connecting Puerto de los Mármoles on the northern side of the city to LZ-2 on the southern side. These three roads form the island's central road axis from which other roads connect to the rest of the island's towns, settlements and points of interest.

Public transport on the island is provided by Arrecife Bus, operating under the name of Intercity Bus Lanzarote. The company operates 30 bus lines connecting the island's major and minor settlements, as well as serving the airport, and includes internal bus services in the towns of Playa Blanca, San Bartolomé and Tías. Most lines begin or end in the capital, Arrecife. The public bus service within the city of Arrecife is provided by the local council and consists of five lines, including one to the neighbouring town of Playa Honda.

== Notable people ==
- Francisco Aguilar y Leal (1776–1840), soldier and merchant
- Princess Alexia of Greece and Denmark (born 1965), Greek royalty, resides on the island
- Rosana Arbelo (born 1963), singer
- Diego Barber, guitarist
- Benito Cabrera (born 1963), musician
- Blas Cabrera Felipe (1878–1945), physicist
- José Clavijo y Fajardo (1726–1806), journalist
- Saúl Coco (born 1999), footballer
- Juan Curbelo (1680–1760), politician, Alcalde (mayor) of San Antonio de Bexar, Texas (1737, 1739)
- Robbie Dale (1940-2021), British radio disc jockey
- Archie Davies (born 1998), English footballer
- Dorotea de Armas (1899 – 1997), traditional ceramist
- Pupo De Luca (1924-2006), Italian actor and jazz musician
- Paco Delgado (born 1965), costume designer.
- Penelope Farmer (born 1939), English fiction writer
- Alan Kitching, British graphic designer and architect
- Juan Leal (1676–1742/1743), settler and politician, first mayor of San Antonio
- César Manrique (1919–1992), artist, architect and sculptor
- Jordi Martín (born 1991), footballer
- Óscar Martín (born 1988), footballer
- Manuel Medina (born 1935), politician
- Claudio Mendes (born 2000), footballer
- Carlos Mendes Gomes (born 1998), footballer
- Rafael Morera (1903-1981), footballer
- Jonathan Pérez Olivero (born 1982), footballer
- Hernan Peraza the Younger (c.1450-1488), nobleman and Castilian conquistador
- Jonathan Proietti (born 1982), Luxembourgish footballer
- Salvador Rodríguez (1688–unknown), politician, Regidor (council member) of San Antonio de Bexar, Texas
- Carlos Morales Quintana (born 1970), architect and husband of Princess Alexia, resides on the island
- Patricia Díaz Perea (born 1984), triathlete, represents Lanzarote-based club Triatlón Titanes
- Stephan Remmler (born 1946), German musician
- Nasser Saleh (born 1992), actor
- José Saramago (1922–2010), Portuguese writer, resided on the island
- Beverly Swerling (1938-2018), American writer
- Jason deCaires Taylor (born 1974), British sculptor
- Kimberley Tell (born 1989), Canarian actress and singer
- Goya Toledo (born 1969), actress and model
- Jonas Van de Steene (born 1987), Belgian Para-cyclist
- Jacinto Vera (1813-1881), Uruguayan Roman Catholic prelate
- Thomas Zacharias (born 1947), German high jumper
- Rayderley Zapata (born 1993), gymnast

== Festivals ==
The most established festival on the island is held each year on 15 September in the village of Mancha Blanca, in honour of Our Lady of Dolours (Virgen de los Dolores), also called the "Virgin of the Volcanoes" (the Patron Saint of Lanzarote). People from all over the island participate in this pilgrimage, mostly dressed in traditional costumes.

== Sport ==
The island's only professional football team is UD Lanzarote, founded in 1970 who play at the 7,000 capacity Ciudad Deportiva de Lanzarote. The island is also home to smaller clubs CD Teguise and CD Orientación Marítima. In tennis, the Open Isla de Lanzarote was hosted between 2006 and 2008. The island is well known for its epic Ironman Triathlon race held there for 34 years

== Views ==
Panoramic view of Lanzarote, from Los Ajaches on the SW, over Timanfaya National Park, to the Famara cliffs and mountain range on the NE, as seen from the peak of Montaña Blanca.

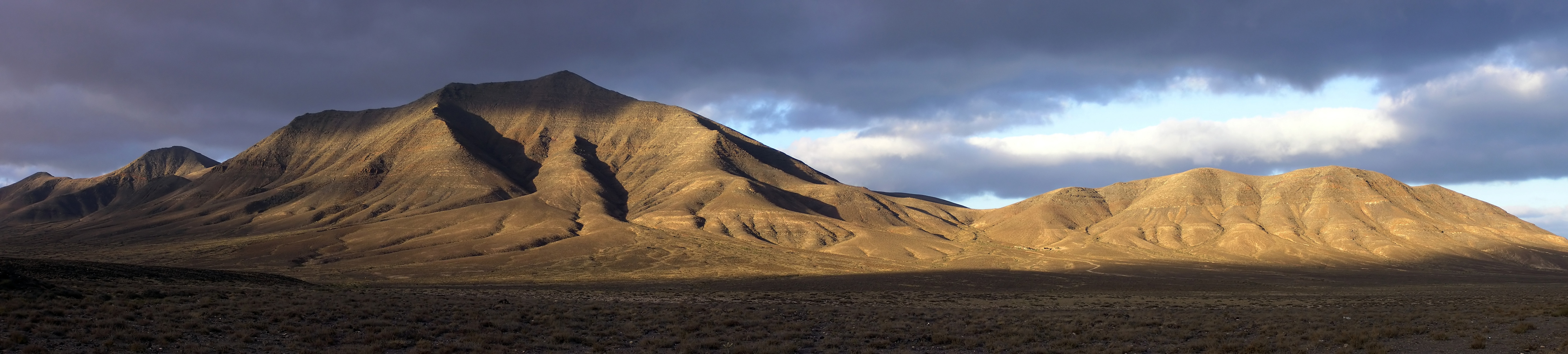
Hacha Grande, in the south of the island, viewed from the road to Papagayo beach

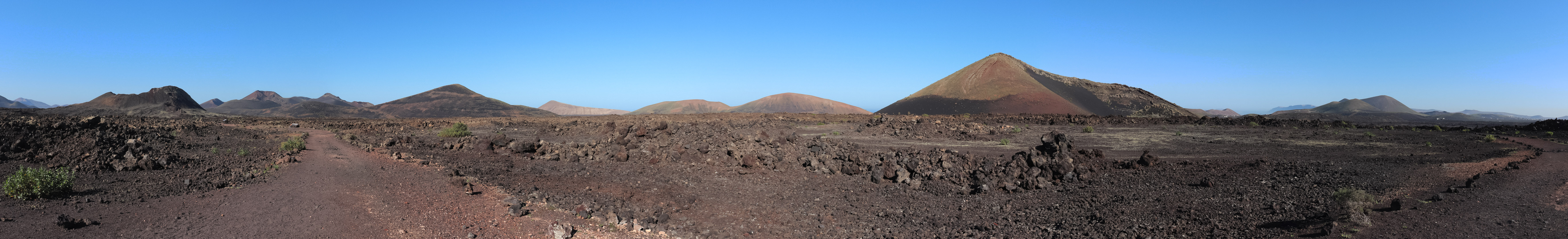
Panoramic view of lava and pyroclastic rock covered landscape in the central part of Lanzarote.

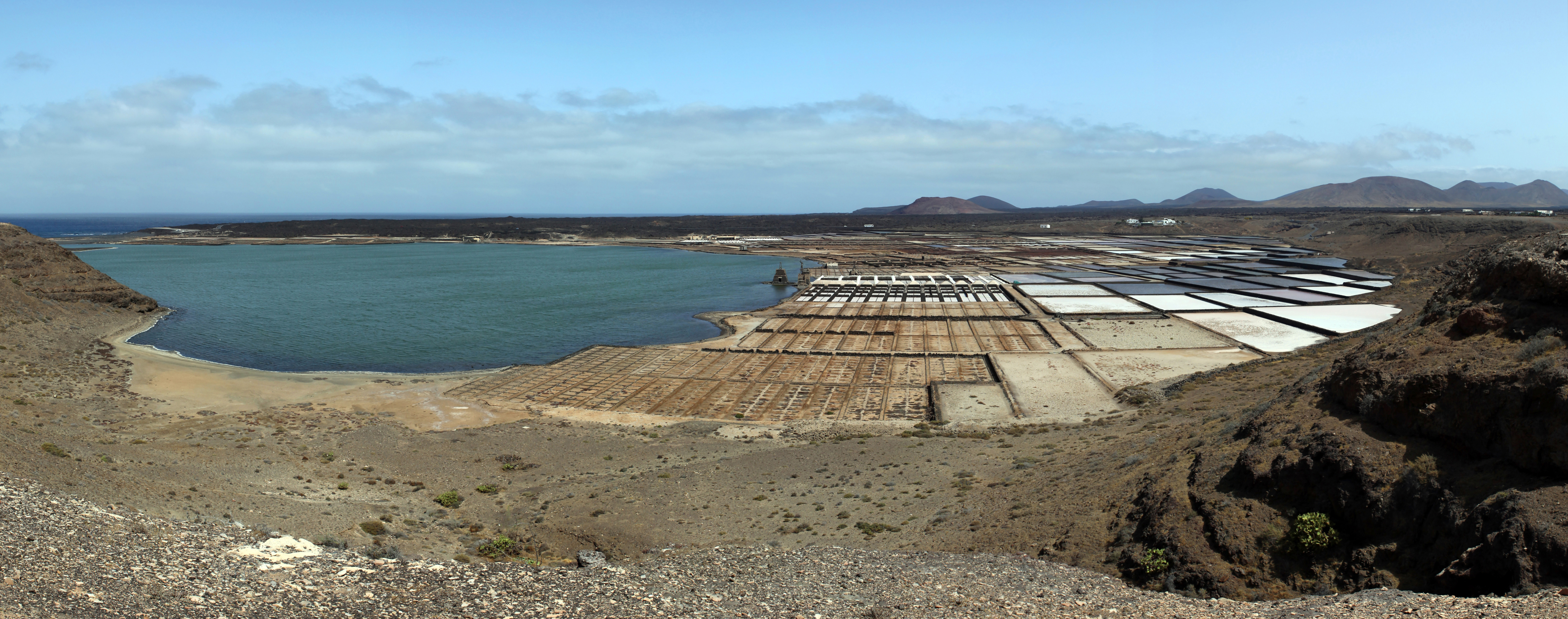
Salinas de Janubio, in the west of the island

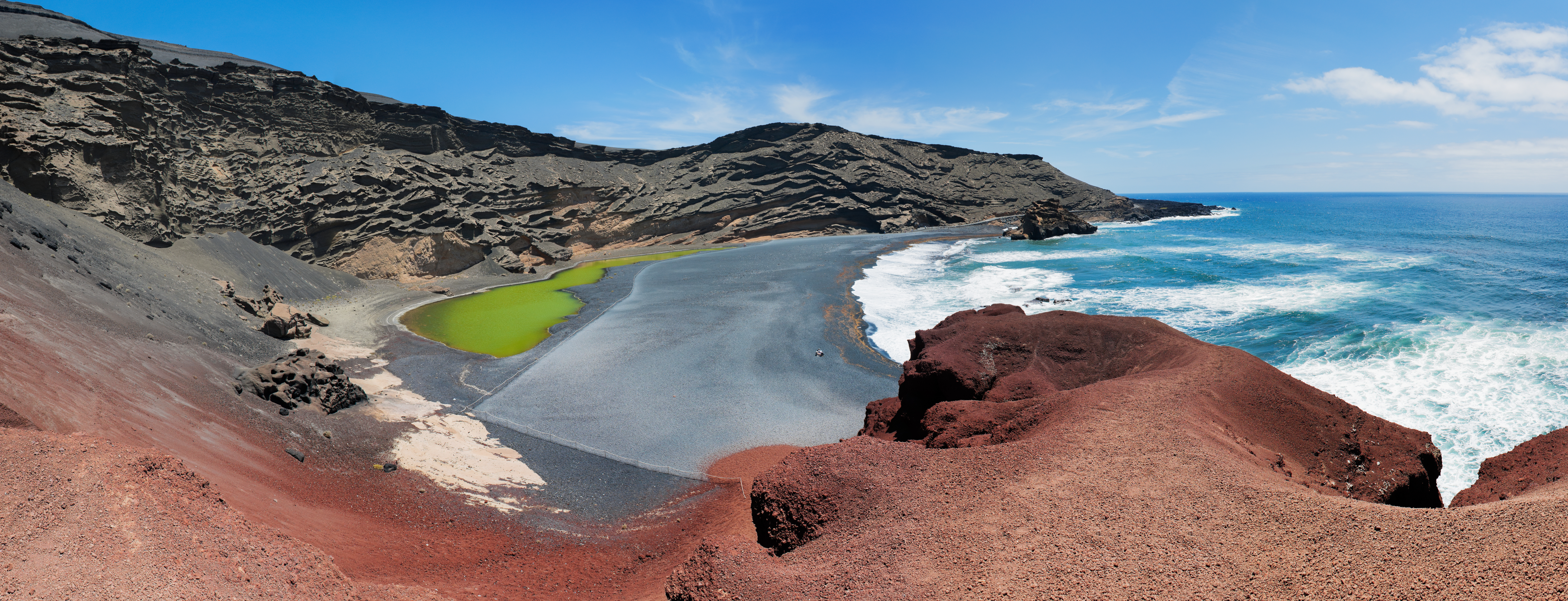
Crater and laguna in El Golfo
