= Dream City (disambiguation) =

Dream City is an operetta by Victor Herbert and Edgar Smith

Dream City may also refer to:

- Diamond Research and Mercantile City, also known as DREAM City, an upcoming business district in Surat, Gujarat, India
- Dream City Church, a Pentecostal megachurch in Phoenix, Arizona
- Dream City Film Club, a North London-based band
- LOHAS Park, formerly Dream City, a residential development
- "Dream City", a song by Samantha Fox from the album Samantha Fox (album)
- Dream City: Essential Recordings, an album by Greg Brown (folk musician)
- Dream City (film), a film directed by Johannes Schaaf

== See also ==
- City of Dreams
