= Jonathan Proietti =

Luxembourgish footballer

Personal information
- Date of birth: 17 July 1982 (age 44)
- Place of birth: Lanzarote, Spain
- Height: 1.70 m (5 ft 7 in)
- Position: Midfielder

Senior career*
Years	Team	Apps	(Gls)
2003–2005	CA Spora Luxembourg	?	(?)
2005–2006	CS Grevenmacher	?	(?)
2006–2007	F91 Dudelange	?	(?)
2007–2008	FC RM Hamm Benfica	?	(?)
2008–2011	FC Progrès Niederkorn	50	(8)

International career^{‡}
2008	Luxembourg	1	(0)
- * Club domestic league appearances and goals as of 7 July 2022 ‡ National team caps and goals as of 21 February 2011

Jonathan Proietti (born 17 July 1982) is a former Luxembourgish international footballer who last played club football for FC Progrès Niederkorn, as a midfielder.
