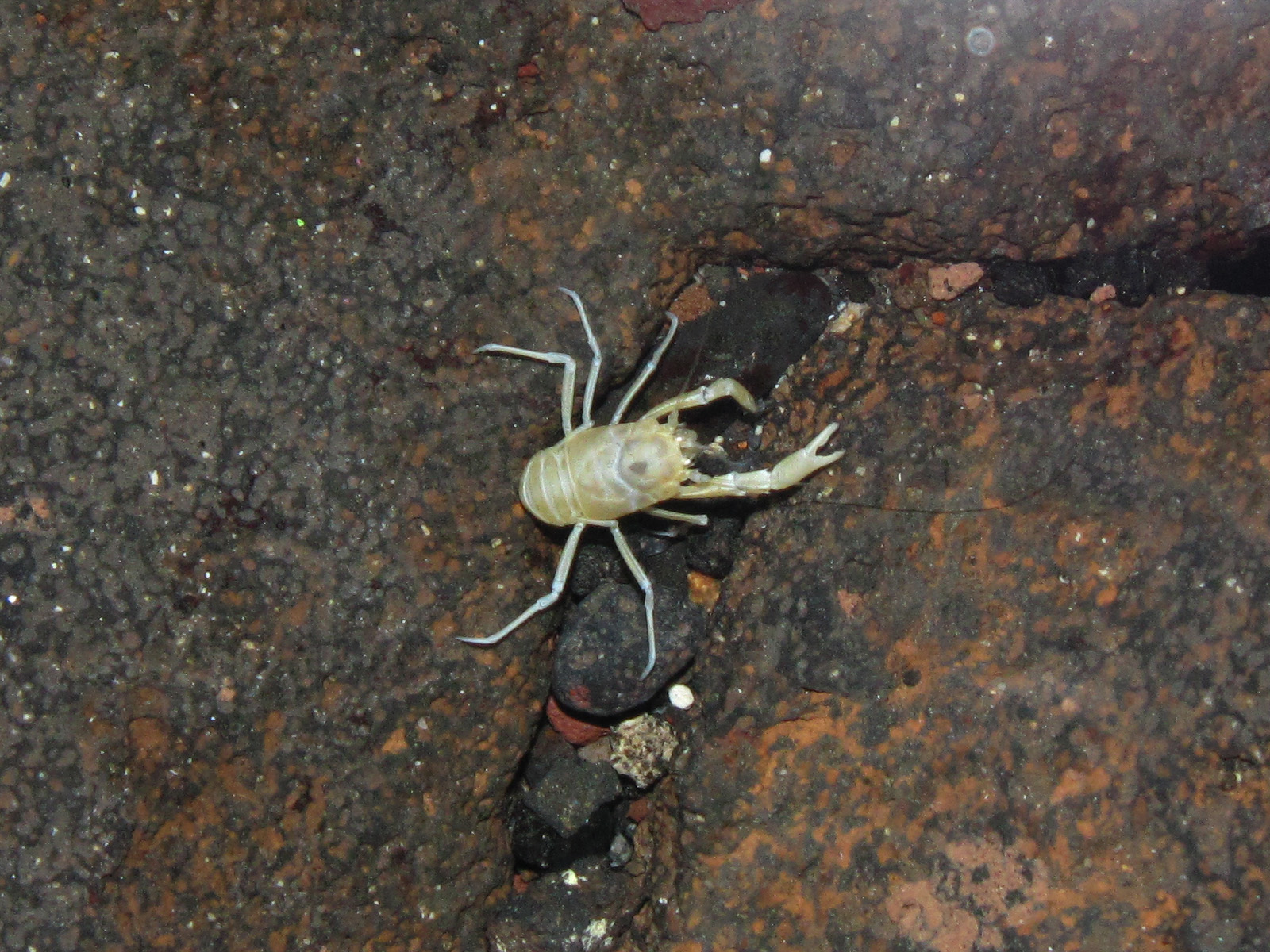

Scientific classification
- Domain: Eukaryota
- Kingdom: Animalia
- Phylum: Arthropoda
- Class: Malacostraca
- Order: Decapoda
- Suborder: Pleocyemata
- Infraorder: Anomura
- Family: Munidopsidae
- Genus: Munidopsis
- Species: M. polymorpha

Binomial name
- Munidopsis polymorpha Koelbel, 1892

= Munidopsis polymorpha =

Species of crustacean

Munidopsis polymorpha is a species of squat lobster (also known as the blind albino cave crab, Jameos blind crab or jameito) that is endemic to Lanzarote, Canary Islands. They are small, blind and pale, and can be found in the caves of Jameos del Agua, in lava tubes formed by volcanic eruptions 15,000 - 13,000 years ago. Ovigerous females carry only two eggs which are relatively big in contrast to the numerous small eggs in other anomuran crustaceans. It is the animal symbol of the island of Lanzarote.

== See also ==
- List of animal and plant symbols of the Canary Islands
