= City of Dreams (novel) =

2001 novel by Beverly Swerling

City of Dreams: A Novel of Nieuw Amsterdam and Early Manhattan
- Author: Beverly Swerling
- Language: English
- Genre: Historical fiction
- Set in: Nieuw Amsterdam
- Publisher: Bantam Books, Simon & Schuster
- Publication date: October 2001
- Publication place: United States
- Media type: Print
- Pages: 592
- Followed by: City of Glory

City of Dreams is a historical novel by Beverly Swerling, published in 2001. It is the multi-generational history of a family of immigrants set in Nieuw Amsterdam and early Manhattan.
