= Tunnel de la Atlantida =

Volcanic submarine lava tube in the Canary Islands

The entrance to Cueva de los Verdes.

Túnel de la Atlántida (English: Tunnel of Atlantis) is the world's longest known volcanic submarine lava tube. It is located in the Canary Islands off the coast of North Africa. It is the underwater portion of the Cueva de los Verdes lava tube at Haría, Las Palmas. The 1.5 km long tube formed some 20,000 years ago when the Monte Corona volcano erupted on the island of Lanzarote. The erupted molten rock flowed across the land and into the ocean.
