= Mancha Blanca =

Coordinates: 29.043°N 13.69°W

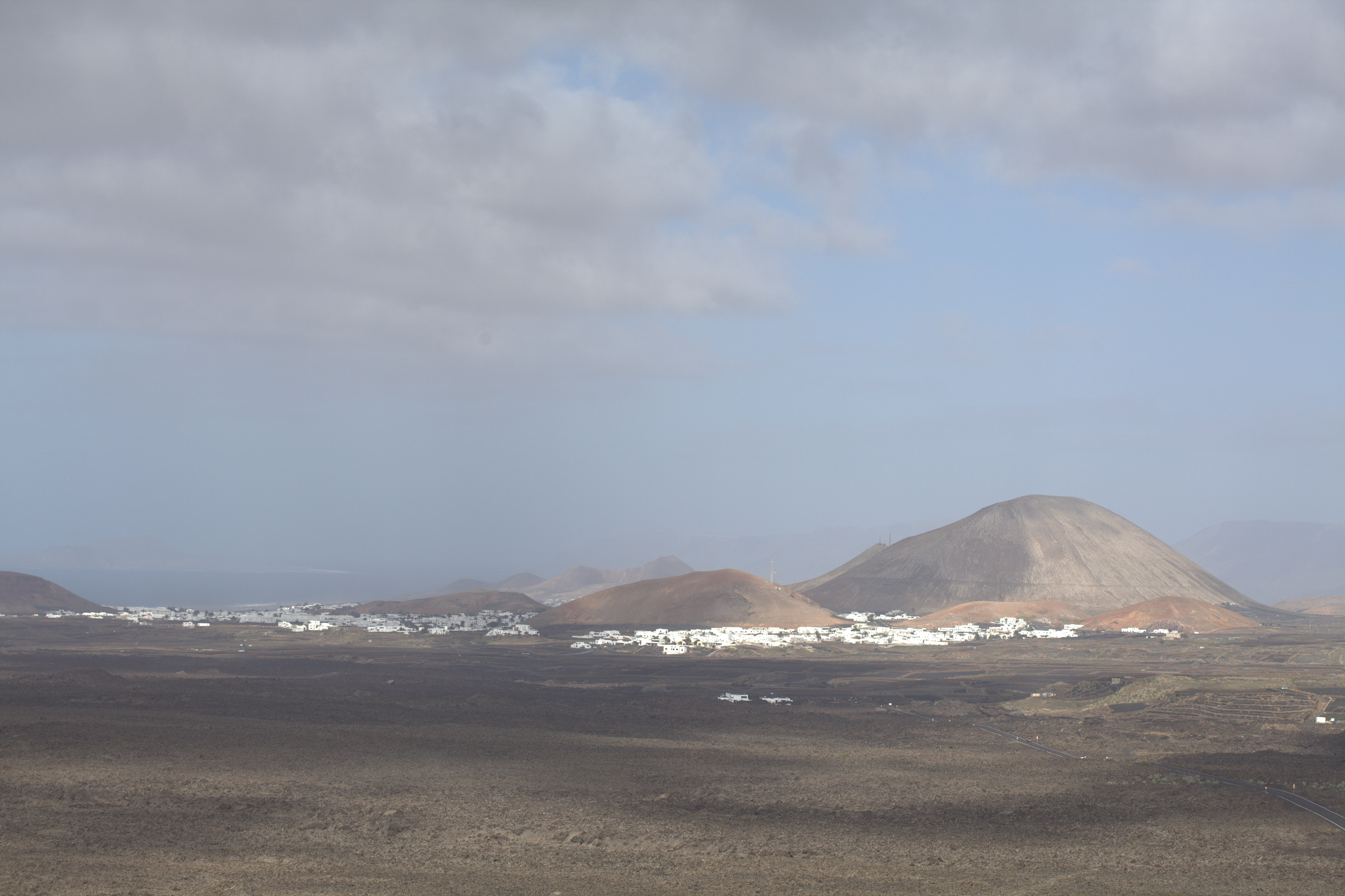
Mancha Blanca from Montana Tingafa

Mancha Blanca is a village in Tinajo, Las Palmas province of western Lanzarote in the Canary Islands. In Mancha Blanca is the chapel of the Our Lady of Dolours (Virgen de los Dolores), the patron saint of the island of Lanzarote.
