= Cueva de los Verdes =

Cave in the Canary Islands (Spain)

Coordinates: 29°09′40″N 13°26′20″W

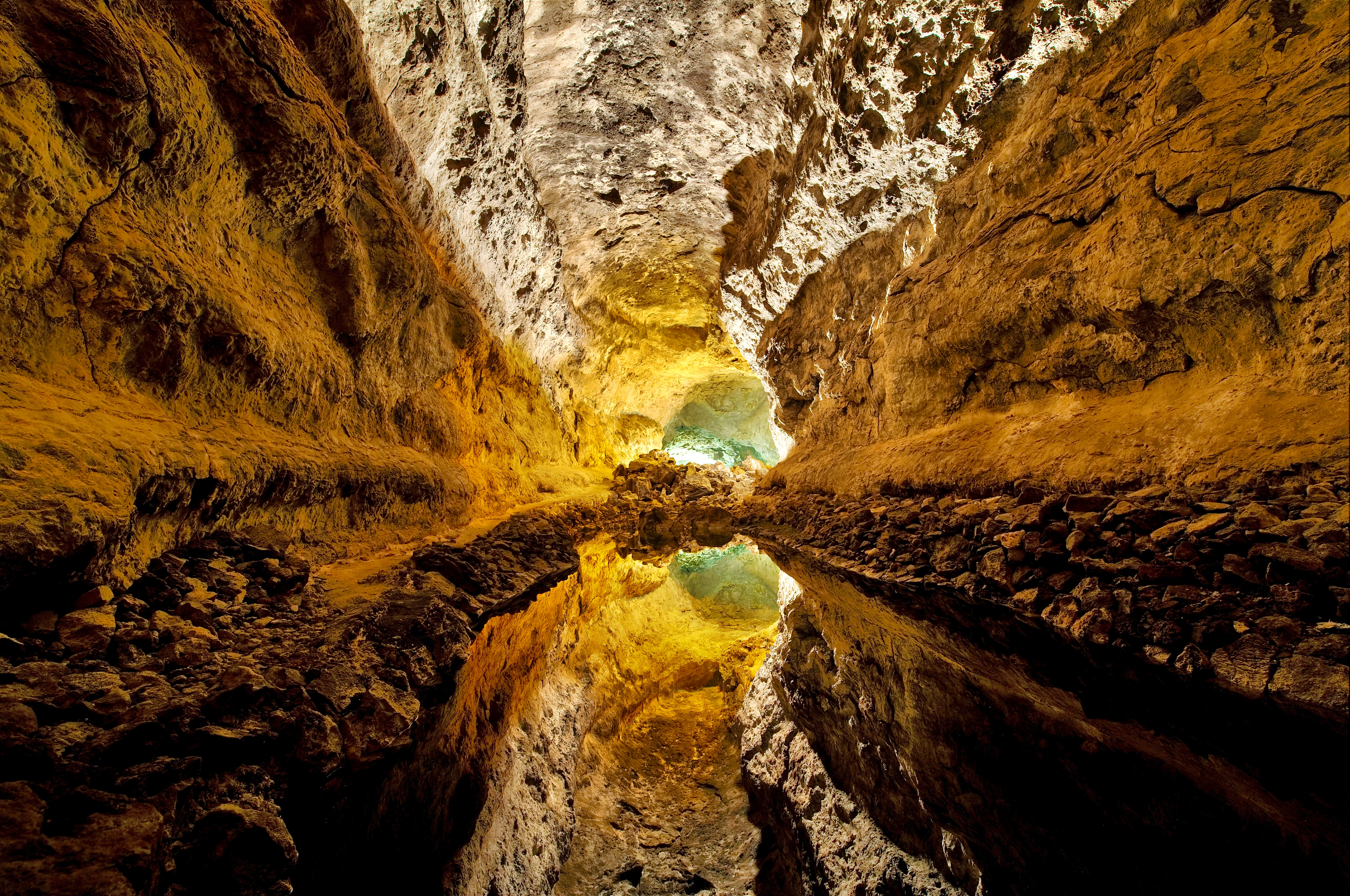

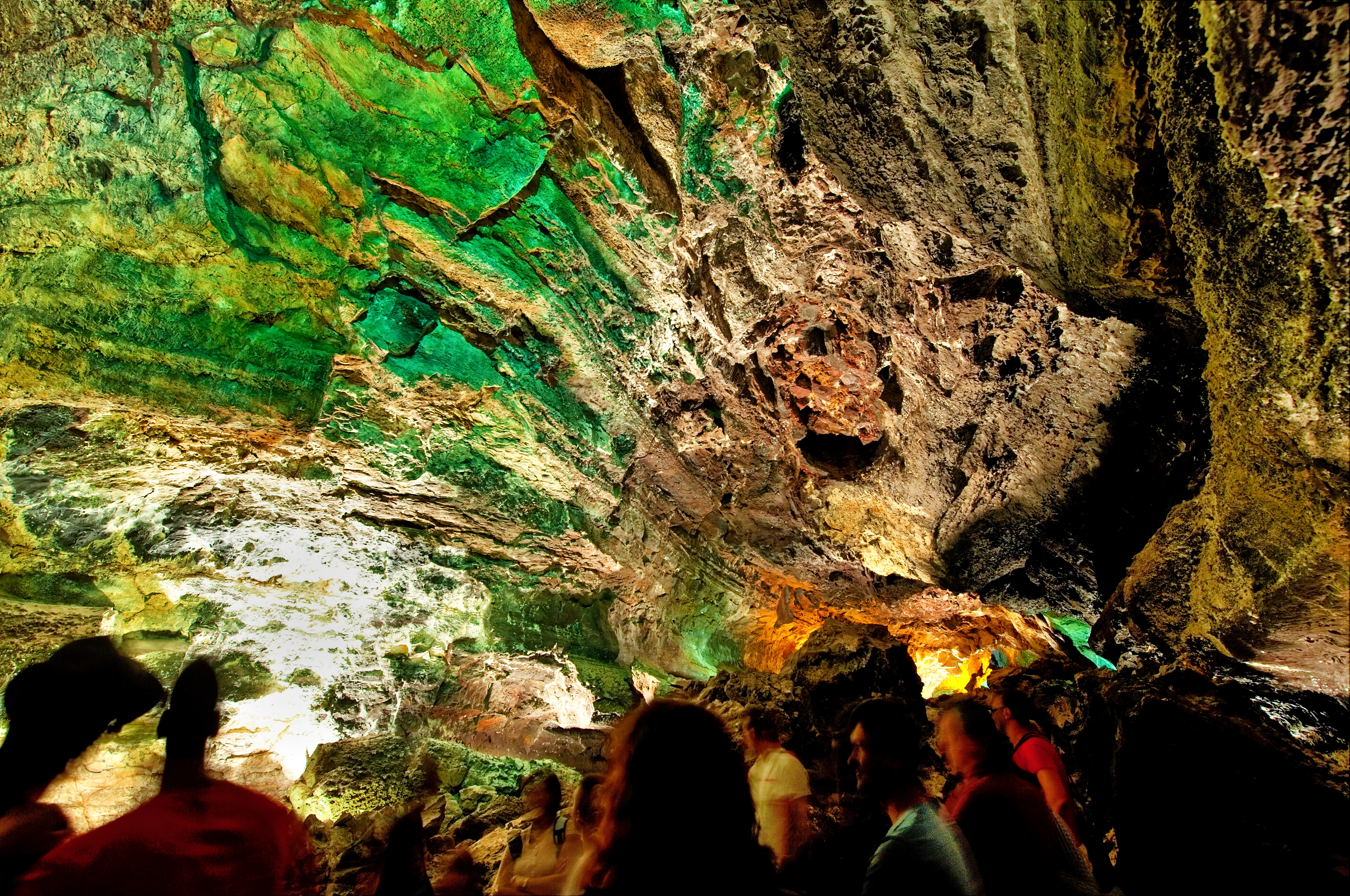
Tourists visit the cave interior

Cueva de los Verdes (Spanish for "Verdes' cave", from the "Verdes" family) is a lava tube and tourist attraction of the Haria municipality on the island of Lanzarote in the Canary Islands (Spain). The cave lies within the Monumento Natural del Malpaís de La Corona, a protected area of the Canary Islands.

The cave was created around 3,000 years ago by lava flows erupting from the nearby volcano Monte Corona, flowing across the Malpaís de la Corona toward the sea. As in all lava tubes, the top of a lava stream cooled and developed a solid crust, and the lava stream later drained away leaving the top crust as the roof of a cave. In about 20 spots, the roof of the cave collapsed, forming a cavern known locally as a jameo. The caves extend for 6 kilometres (3.7 mi) above sea level and for another 1.5 kilometres (0.93 mi) below the sea (the Tunnel de la Atlantida).

One jameo forms the entrance to the Cueva de los Verdes. Two kilometres of the cave system were developed for tourists in the 1960s, with the cave walls illuminated by colorful lights.

The cave is also famous for its concert hall which is located near the entrance and exit of the cave. The concert hall has about 15 to 20 rows with 26 seats in each row, allowing up to 500 people in the concert hall at once.

In earlier centuries, inhabitants throughout Lanzarote hid in this cave to protect themselves from pirates and raiders.
