= Timanfaya National Park =

National park and biosphere reserve in the Canary Islands, Spain

- Parque Nacional de Timanfaya
- IUCN category II (national park)
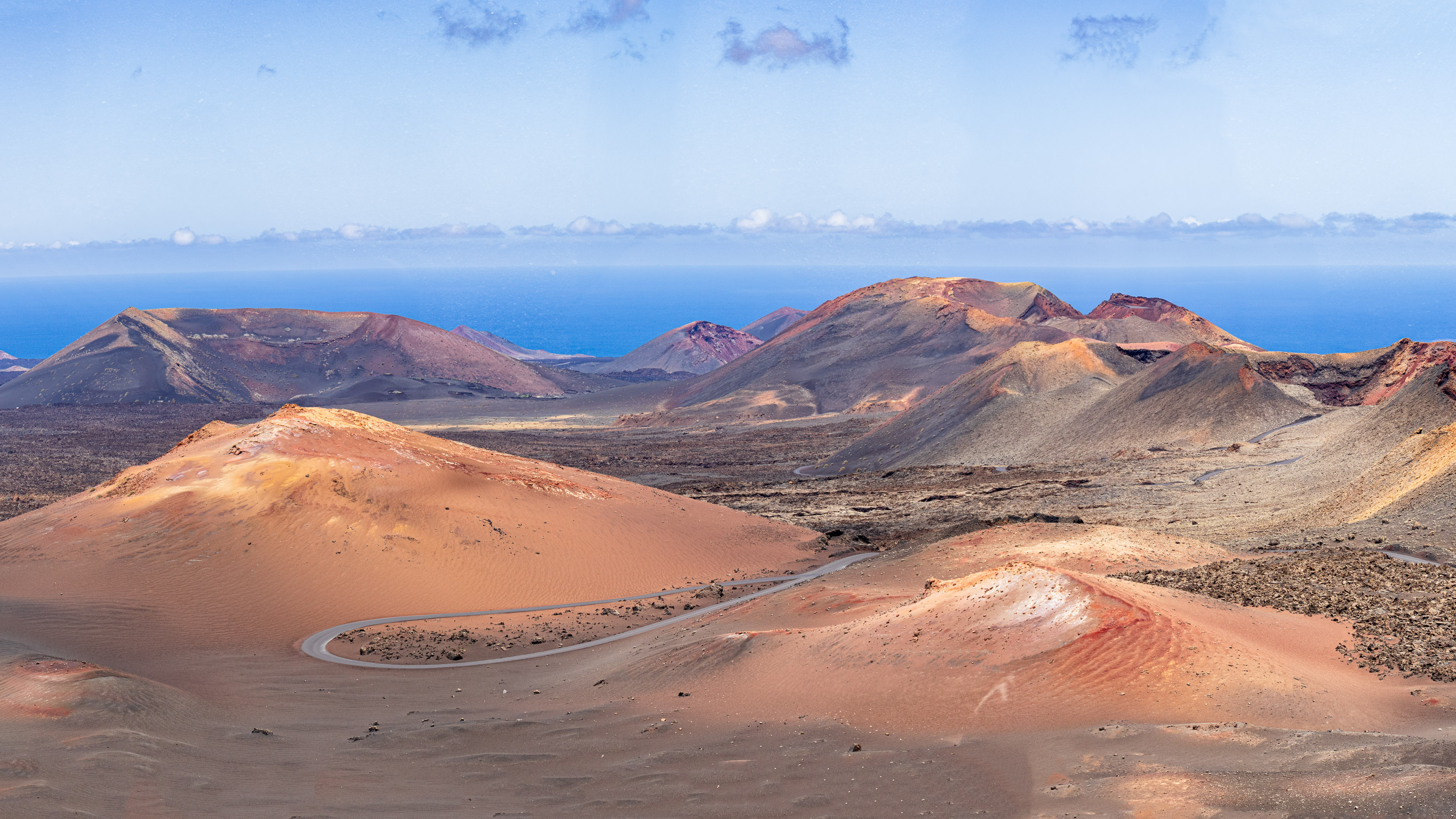

- Location within Lanzarote Location within Spain, Canary Islands
- Location of Timanfaya
- Location: Lanzarote, Canary Islands, Spain
- Coordinates: 28°59′39″N 13°47′36″W
- Area: 51.07 km^{2} (19.72 sq mi)
- Established: 1974
- Governing body: Consejería de Medio Ambiente y Ordenación Territorial
- Website: www.gobiernodecanarias.org/parquesnacionales/timanfaya/index.html

Timanfaya National Park (Spanish: Parque Nacional de Timanfaya) is a Spanish national park in the southwestern part of the island of Lanzarote, in the Canary Islands. It covers parts of the municipalities Tinajo and Yaiza. The area is 51.07 square kilometres (19.72 sq mi), entirely made up of volcanic soil. It is the only National Park in Spain which is entirely geological. The statue El Diablo of César Manrique is its symbol. Timanfaya National Park represents a sign of recent and historical volcanism in the Macaronesian region. The last volcanic eruptions occurred in 1824; however, most of the area covered by the national park was transformed by the eruptive period from 1730 to 1736.

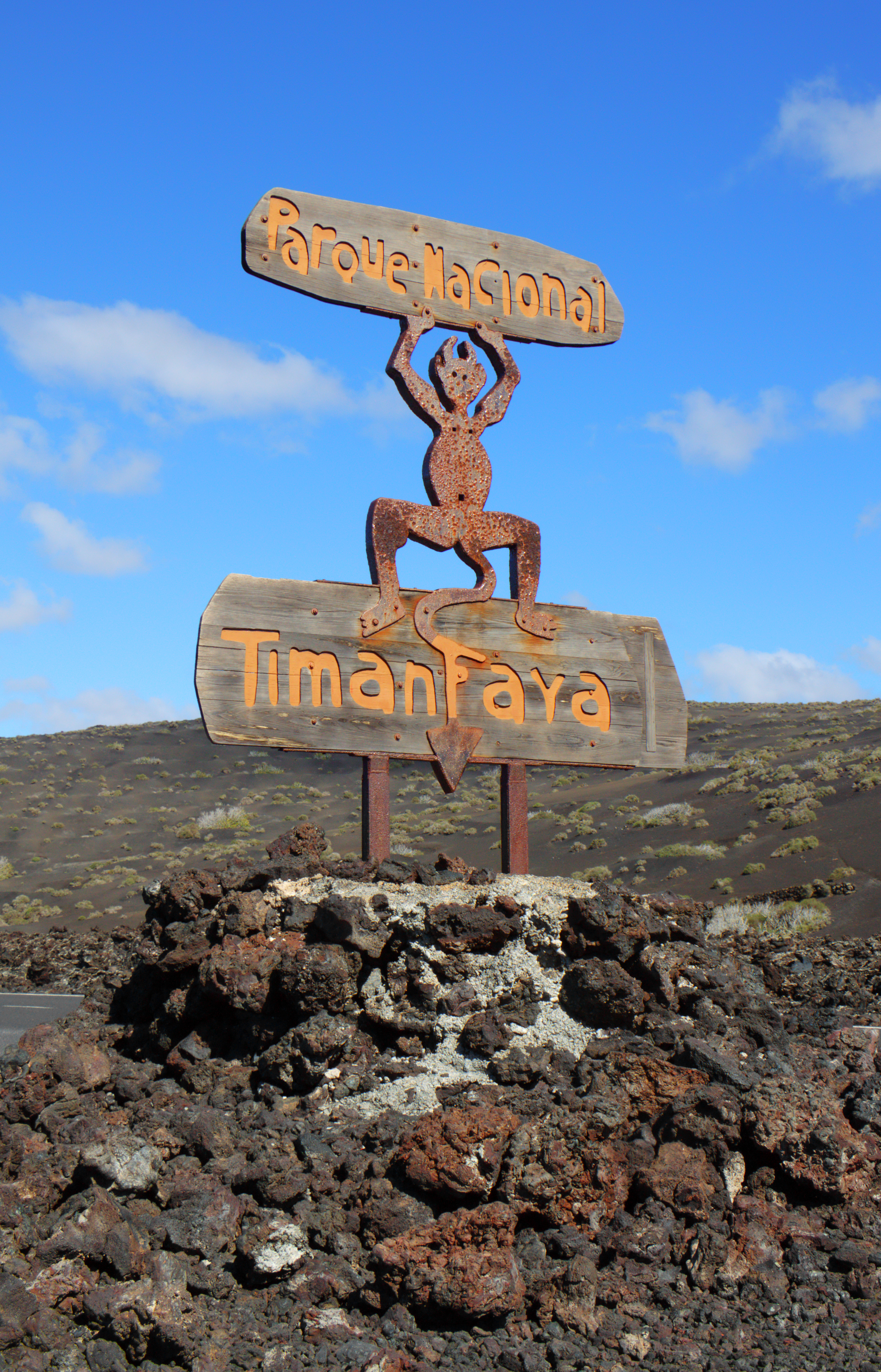
El Diablo - symbol of the park designed by César Manrique.

Views of Timanfaya National Park
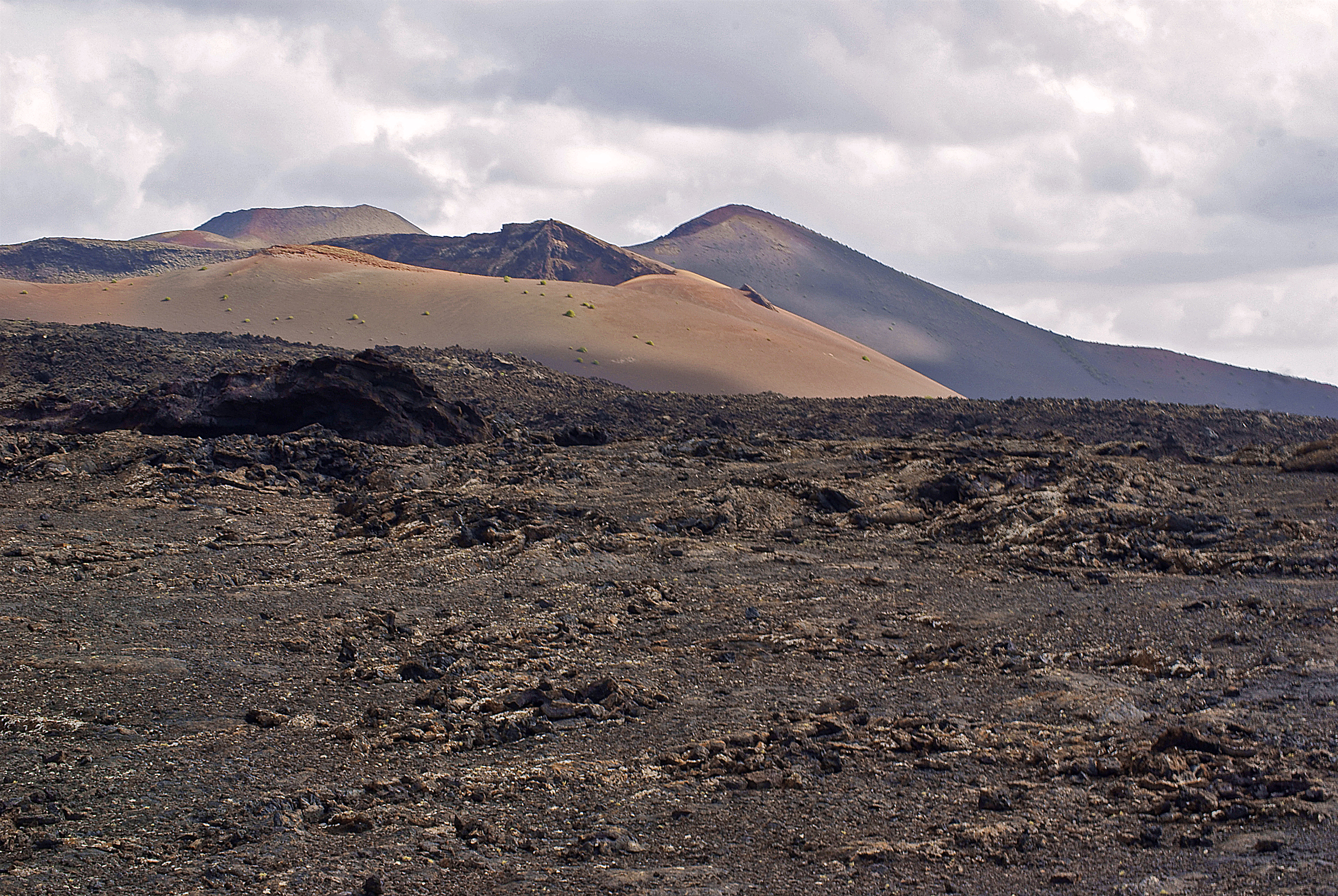
Timanfaya landscape

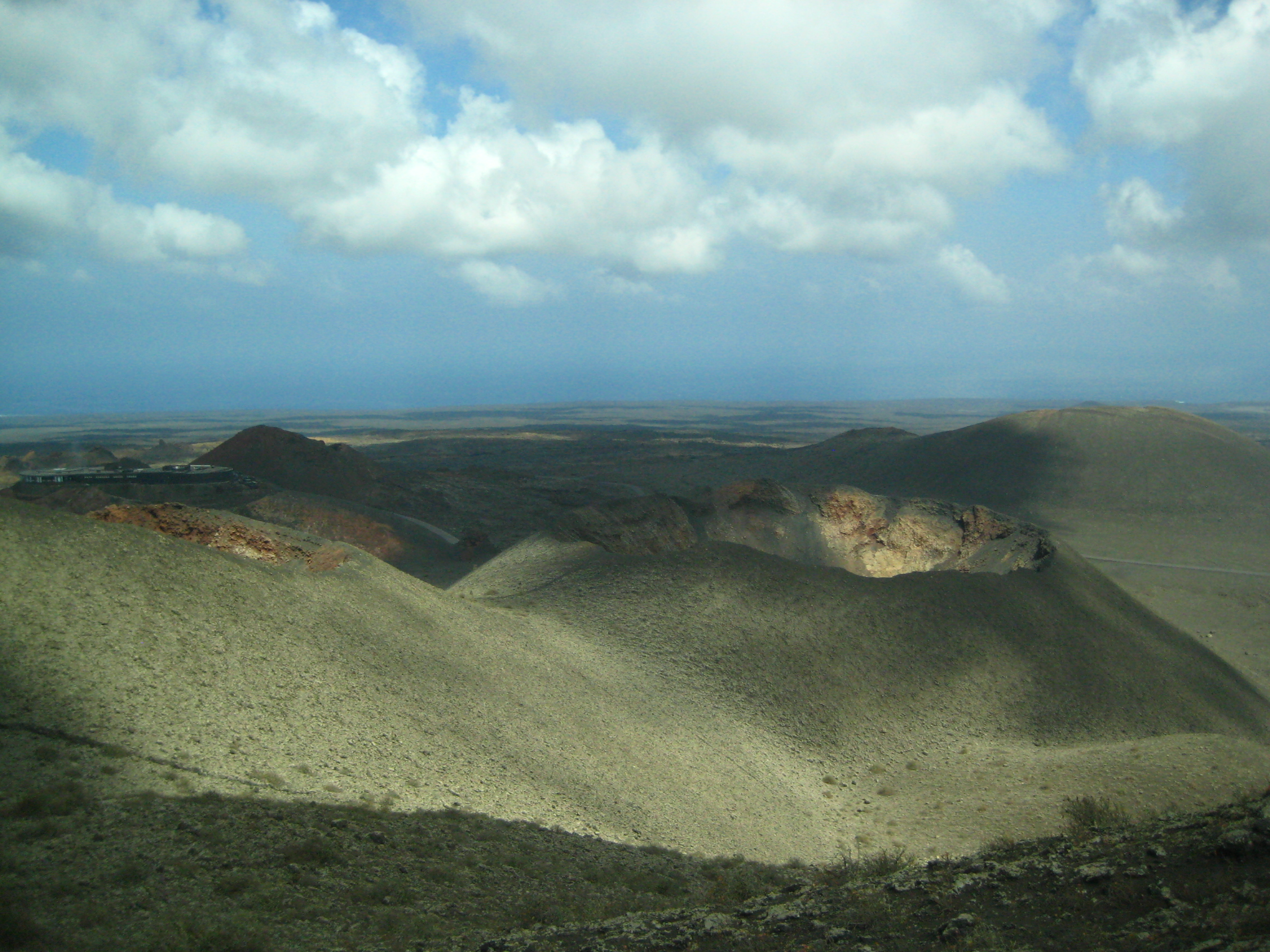
Timanfaya landscape

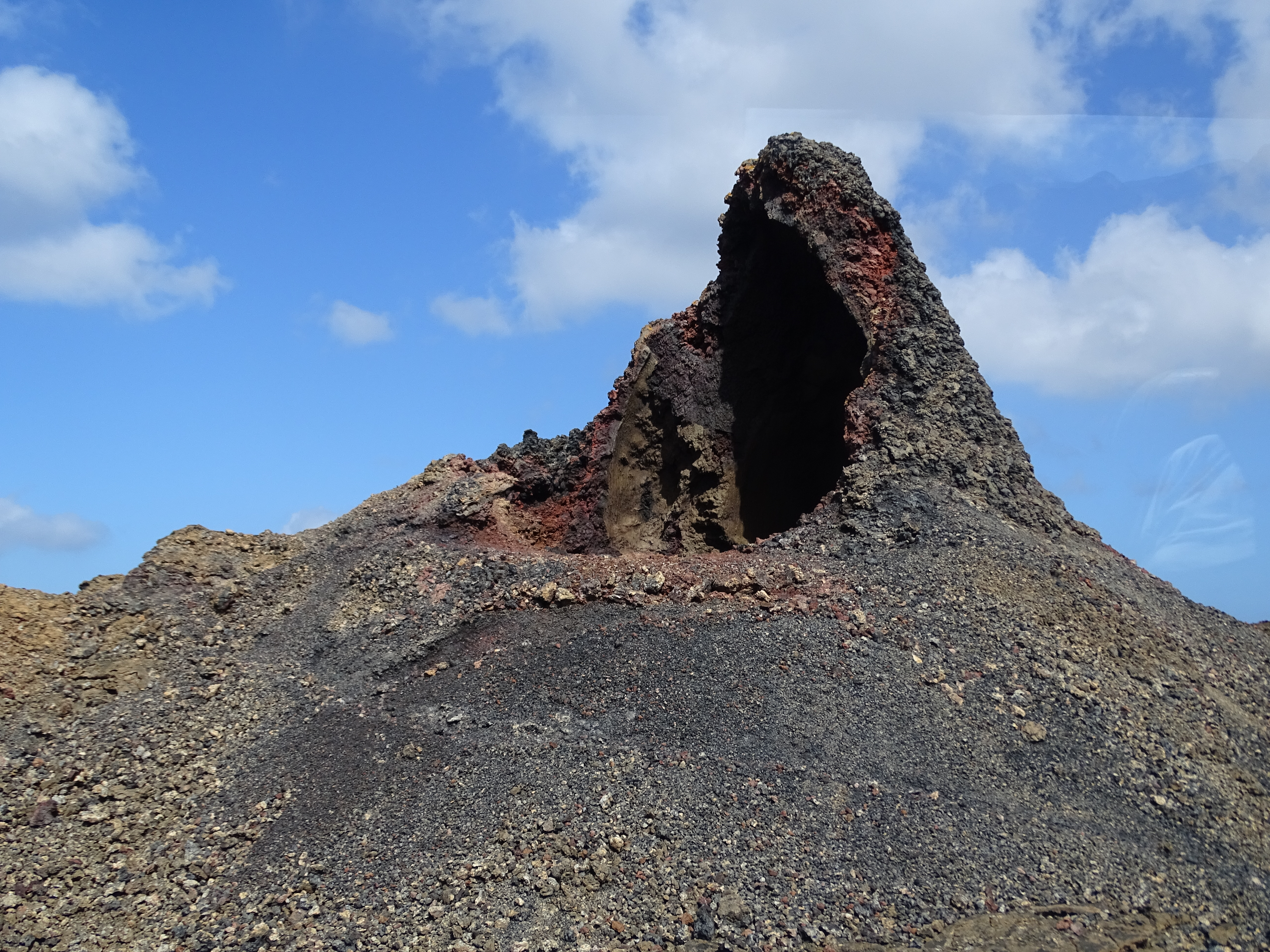
Manto de la Virgen

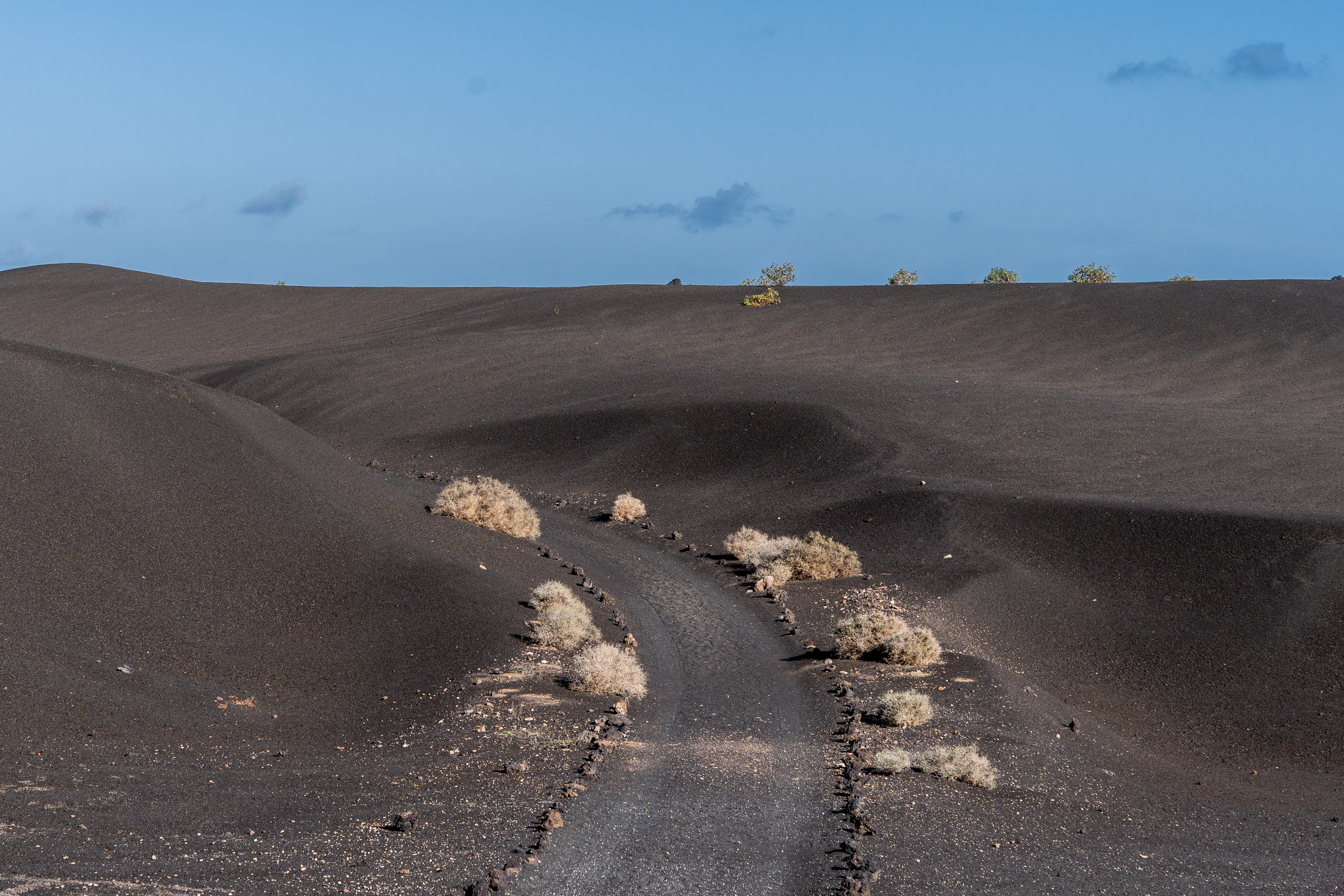
Tremesana trail in Timanfaya National Park

== Volcanic activity ==
The greatest recorded eruptions occurred between 1730 and 1736. The eruption period started outside the national park area, at Caldera de Los Cuervos volcano on 1 September 1730 and ended with the eruption of Montaña Colorada volcano, 1.7 km (1.1 mi) north-east of El Cuervo, which has ceased the activity on 16 April 1736. The volcanic activity continues as the surface temperature in the core ranges from 100 to 600 °C (212 to 1,112 °F) at the depth of 13 metres (43 ft). This natural phenomenon is used as a tourist attraction in which water is poured into a cavity, followed by an almost instantaneous expulsion of steam.

== Ecological value ==
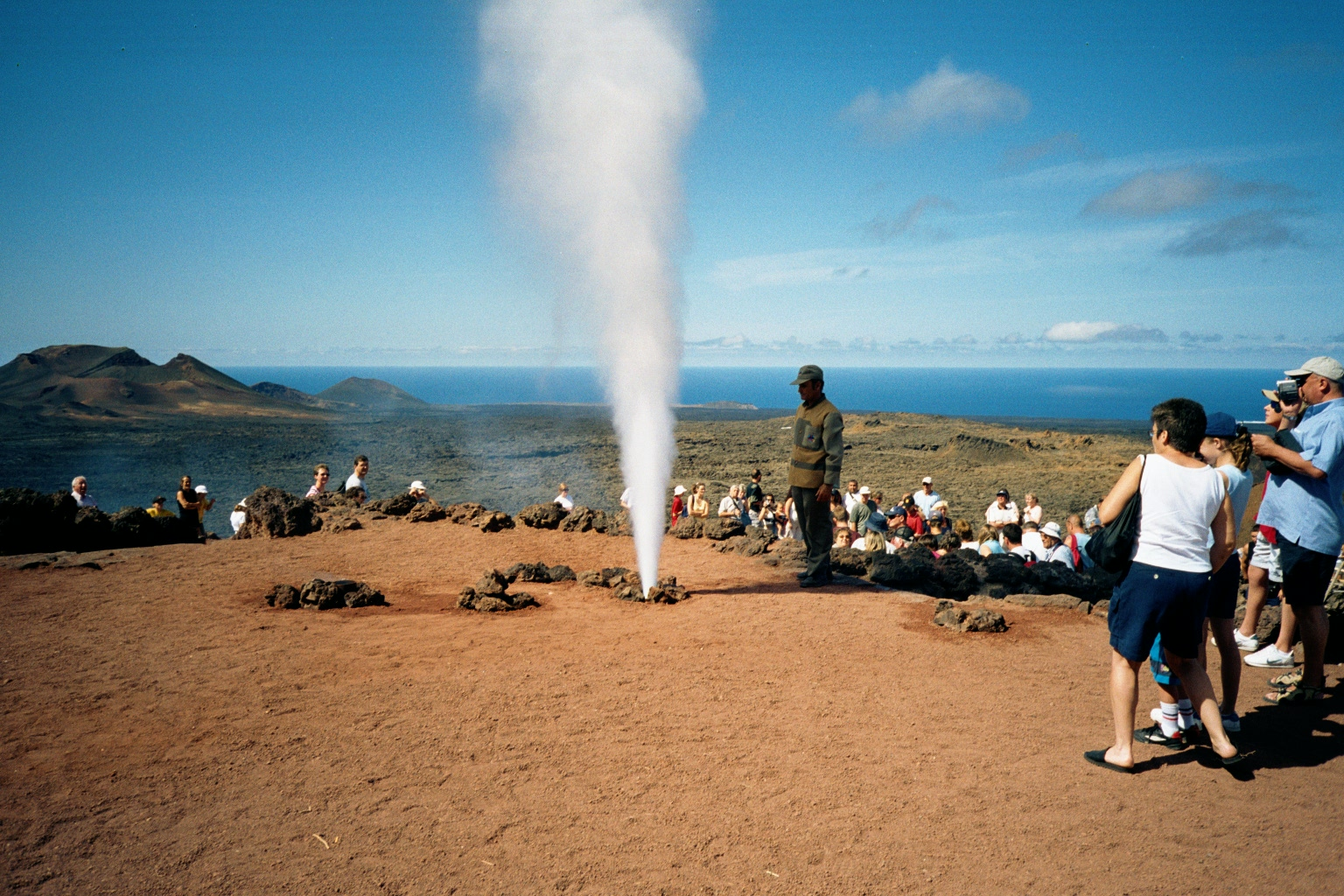
Tourists in the park

In 1993, UNESCO designated a Biosphere reserve covering the whole of Lanzarote. The national park is one of the core areas of the biosphere reserve.

Access to the park by the public is strictly regulated to protect the delicate flora and fauna. There is a public car park from which one can tour the volcanic landscape by coach using a road that is otherwise closed to the public. There are only two footpaths which are accessible exclusively with a prior authorization and a guide.
