= Beverly Swerling =

American writer

- Born: 1938; Boston
- Died: 3 December 2018 (aged 79–80)

Beverly Swerling (1938 – 3 December 2018) was an American writer of historical fiction.

== Biography ==
Born in Boston, Beverly Swerling grew up in nearby Revere, Massachusetts living with her parents in the boarding house they ran. After attending college in Kansas City (MO) Swerling relocated to New York City to pursue a writing career, working at an insurance agency until established as a freelance journalist. For a time Swerling was the director of a Boston-area halfway house for female ex-cons, an experience which formed the basis of her first published book: The Love Seekers, a work of non-fiction published in 1966. The Love Seekers was credited to Beverly Byrne, which name was also utilized in Swerling's journalistic bylines, Byrne having become Swerling's surname via a brief marriage during a European sojourn.

In 1978, Swerling emigrated, accompanied by William F Martin (born 27 August 1926) of Manhattan whom she had recently married: the couple would live abroad for some twenty-five years, originally on the Isle of Wight and eventually on Lanzarote and on a houseboat in France. It was during this period that Swerling became a published novelist with her debut novel: the whodunit Murder on the Menu, being issued in 1980 as was Jemma, the last-named moving Swerling into the historical fiction genre which would be the mainstay of her novelistic output. These first two novels were both softcover originals credited to Beverly Byrne: among eight subsequent softcovers "Beverly Byrne" had two novels published in hardcover: Women's Rites (1985) and A Matter of Time (1987), and in 1989 Swerling had a third hardcover novel: Juffie Kane published, that book being credited to Beverly S. Martin. A second Beverly S. Martin novel: Mollie Pride, was published in softcover in 1991.

Almost ten years after the 1992 publication of her final novel as Beverly Byrne, Swerling - now returned to New York City with her husband - had her first novel written as Beverly Swerling appear in 2001, that being City of Dreams, the first of four novels set in New York City from its 17th century founding til the "Gilded Age": all four novels were originally published as hardcovers, as were two other Beverly Swerling novels. Having moved from New York City to Philadelphia with her husband, Swerling subsequent to her husband's 29 January 2015 demise spent her final years in Woodbury (CT), where she died 3 December 2018 due to pancreatic cancer.

== Publications ==
as Beverly Byrne

ALL TITLES ARE ORIGINAL SOFTCOVERS IF NOT OTHERWISE NOTED

- The Love Seekers (1966) (hardcover)
- Murder on the Menu (1980) ISBN 978-0-8439-0787-2
- Jemma (1980) ISBN 978-0-449-14375-9
- The Outcast: The Griffin Saga Vol 1 (1981) ISBN 978-0-449-14396-4
- The Adventurer: The Griffin Saga Vol 2 (1982) ISBN 978-0-449-14452-7 (aka Fiery Splendor)
- Women's Rites (1985) hardcover ISBN 978-0-394-54274-4: softcover ISBN 978-0-449-12903-6
- Jason's People (1985) ISBN 978-0-449-12455-0
- A Matter of Time (1987) hardcover ISBN 978-0-394-56287-2: softcover ISBN 978-0-449-13437-5
- Come Sunrise (1987) ISBN 978-0-449-13230-2
- The Morgan Women (1990) ISBN 978-0-553-28468-3
- A Lasting Fire (1991) ISBN 978-0-553-28815-5 (UK edition in hardcover with ISBN 978-0-727-84336-4)
- The Flames of Vengeance (1991) ISBN 978-0-553-29375-3 (UK edition in hardcover with ISBN 978-0-727-84451-4)
- The Firebirds (1991) ISBN 978-0553-29613-6 (UK edition in hardcover with ISBN 978-0-727-84402-6)

as Beverly S. Martin

- Juffie Kane (1989) hardcover ISBN 978-0-553-05345-6: softcover ISBN 978-0-553-28358-7
- Mollie Pride (1991) ISBN 978-0-708-84988-0

as Beverly Swerling

ALL TITLES ORIGINALLY PUBLISHED IN HARDCOVER

- City Of Dreams: A Novel of Nieuw Amsterdam and Early Manhattan. Simon & Schuster. 2001. ISBN 978-0-684-87172-1. trade paperback edition ( ISBN 978-0-684-87173-8) issued 2002 According to WorldCat, the book is held in 798 libraries
- Shadowbrook: A Novel of Love, War, and the Birth of America. Simon & Schuster. 2 March 2004. ISBN 978-0-743-22812-1. (connected with series) trade paperback edition ( ISBN 978-0-743-22813-8) issued 2005
- City of Glory: A Novel of War and Desire in Old Manhattan. Simon & Schuster. 9 January 2007. ISBN 978-0-743-26920-9. trade paperback edition ( ISBN 978-0-743-26921-6 ) issued 2008
- City of God: A Novel of Passion and Wonder in Old New York. Simon & Schuster. 27 October 2009. ISBN 978-1-4165-4922-2.
- City of Promise. Simon & Schuster. 9 August 2011. ISBN 978-1-4391-3694-2.
- 2013 Bristol House (NL, Tempelcode) ISBN 978 94 62320 11 6
- City Of Dreams: A Novel of Nieuw Amsterdam and Early Manhattan. Simon & Schuster. 2002. ISBN 978-0-684-87173-8. According to WorldCat, the book is held in 798 libraries
- Shadowbrook: A Novel of Love, War, and the Birth of America. Simon & Schuster. 1 March 2005. ISBN 978-0-7432-2813-8. (connected with series)
- City of Glory: A Novel of War and Desire in Old Manhattan. Simon & Schuster. 8 January 2008. ISBN 978-0-7432-6921-6.
- City of God: A Novel of Passion and Wonder in Old New York. Simon & Schuster. 9 December 2008. ISBN 978-1-416-54921-5. trade paperback editio ( ISBN 978-1-416-54922-2) issued 2009
- City of Promise. Simon & Schuster. 9 August 2011. ISBN 978-1-439-13694-2. trade paperback edition ( ISBN 978-1-439-13696-6) issued 2012
- 2013 Bristol House (NL, Tempelcode) ISBN 978-0-670-02593-0 trade paperback edition ( ISBN 978-0-142-18080-8) issued 2014
