= Papagayo (disambiguation) =

The Papagayo are strong winds that blow north of the Gulf of Papagayo.

Papagayo may also refer to:

- Papagayo (software)
- Papagayo Peninsula, Costa Rica
- Papagayo River, Mexico
- Papagayos, a village in Chacabuco Department, San Luis Province, Argentina
- Castillo de Papagayo, the original name of Charco del Palo, a Canary Islands naturist village
- Gulf of Papagayo, Costa Rica
- Sesbania sericea, a species of plant

== See also ==
- Papagaio (disambiguation)
