= Haría =

Haría may refer to:

- Haría (municipality), on the island of Lanzarote in the Canary Islands
- Haría (village), on the island of Lanzarote in the Canary Islands
- Haria, Saparua, a village in Indonesia
