= Papagaio (disambiguation) =

Papagaio is a Brazilian steakhouse restaurant chain in Israel.

Papagaio may also refer to:

- Rafael Papagaio (born 1999), Brazilian footballer
- Papagayo Peninsula, Costa Rica
- Papagaios, Minas Gerais, Brazil
- Pico do Papagaio, a Pernambuco, Brazil

== See also ==
- Papagaio River (disambiguation)
- Papagayo (disambiguation)
