= Tabayesco =

Municipality village

Coordinates: 29.128°N 13.480°W

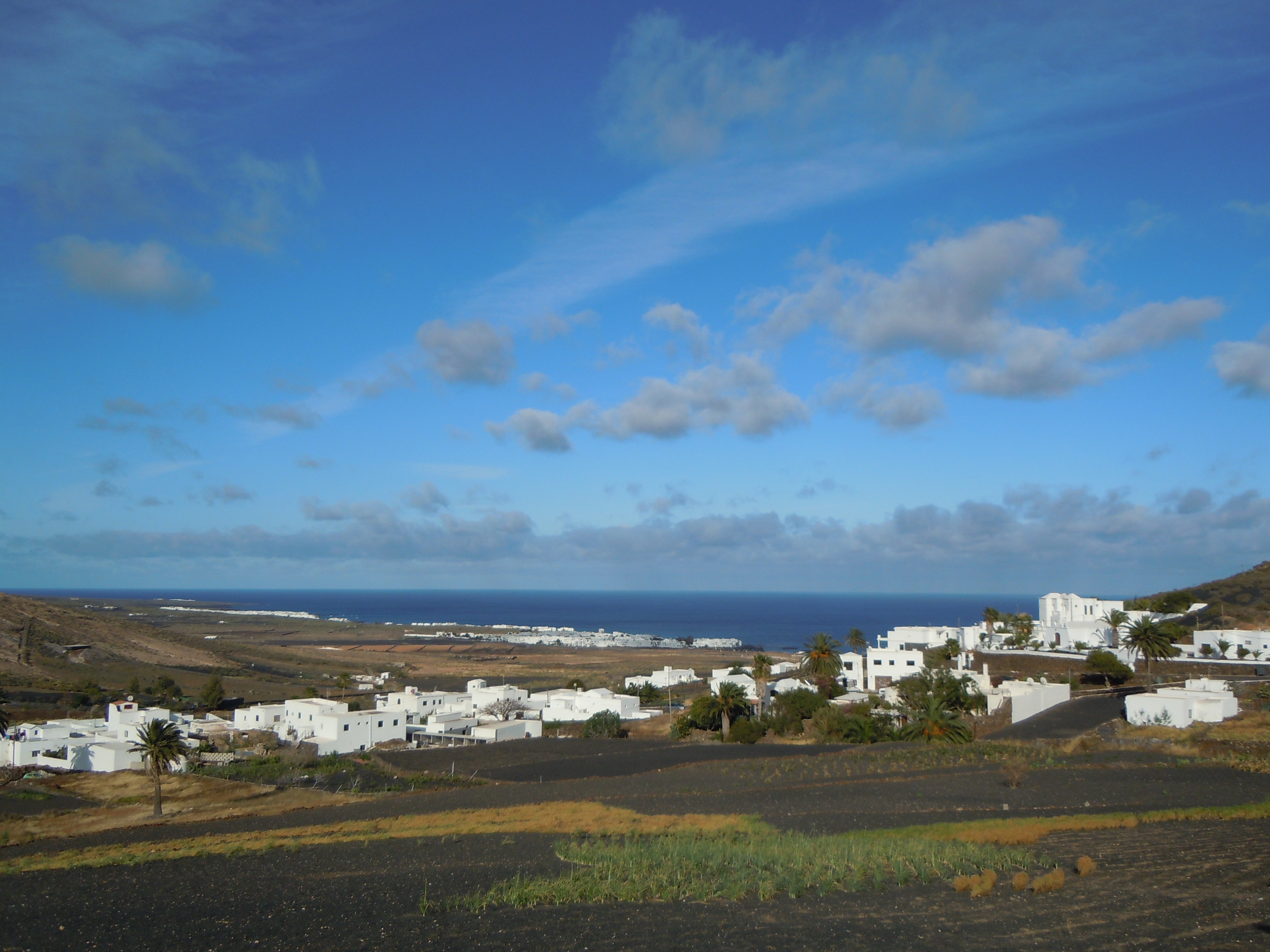
View of Tabayesco

Tabayesco is a village in the municipality of Haría in the Las Palmas province of northern Lanzarote in the Canary Islands.
