= Papagaio River =

There are several rivers named Papagaio River in Brazil:

- Papagaio River (Amazonas)
- Papagaio River (Mato Grosso)

== See also ==
- Papagaio (disambiguation)
- Dos Papagaios River, Paraná, Brazil
- Papagayo River, Mexico
