= Los Molinos, Lanzarote =

Municipality village

Los Molinos is a village in the municipality of Haría in the Las Palmas province of northern Lanzarote in the Canary Islands.
