= Ye, Lanzarote =

Village in the municipality of Haría in the Canary Islands

Coordinates: 29.1958°N 13.4808°W

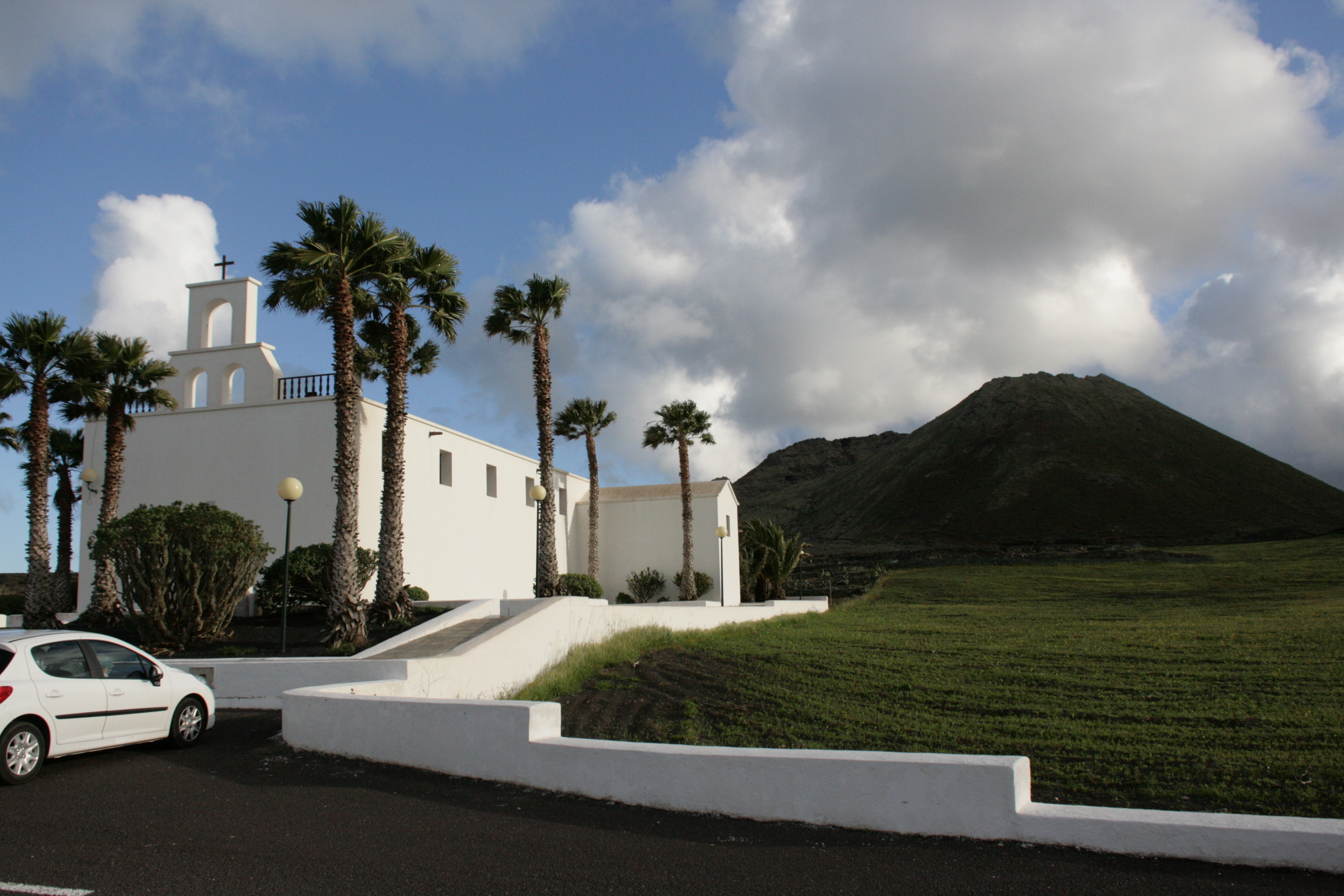
The Church of Ye with Mount Corona in background, Lanzarote, Canary Islands

Ye is a village belonging to the municipality of Haría, on the island of Lanzarote (Canary Islands), located at the foot of the north face of the volcano La Corona.

Originally, this town was a pasture, as stated in an old document of 1576 preserved in the Archives of Teguise, in which Agustin de Herrera y Rojas, owner of the island at that time, bequeathed the property to his daughter Constanza. The name Ye is of Guanche origin. It is thought that the name was originally Eyen and was then shortened to Yen and finally to Yé or Ye.
