= Punta Mujeres =

Coordinates: 29°8′42.99″N 13°26′52.2″W

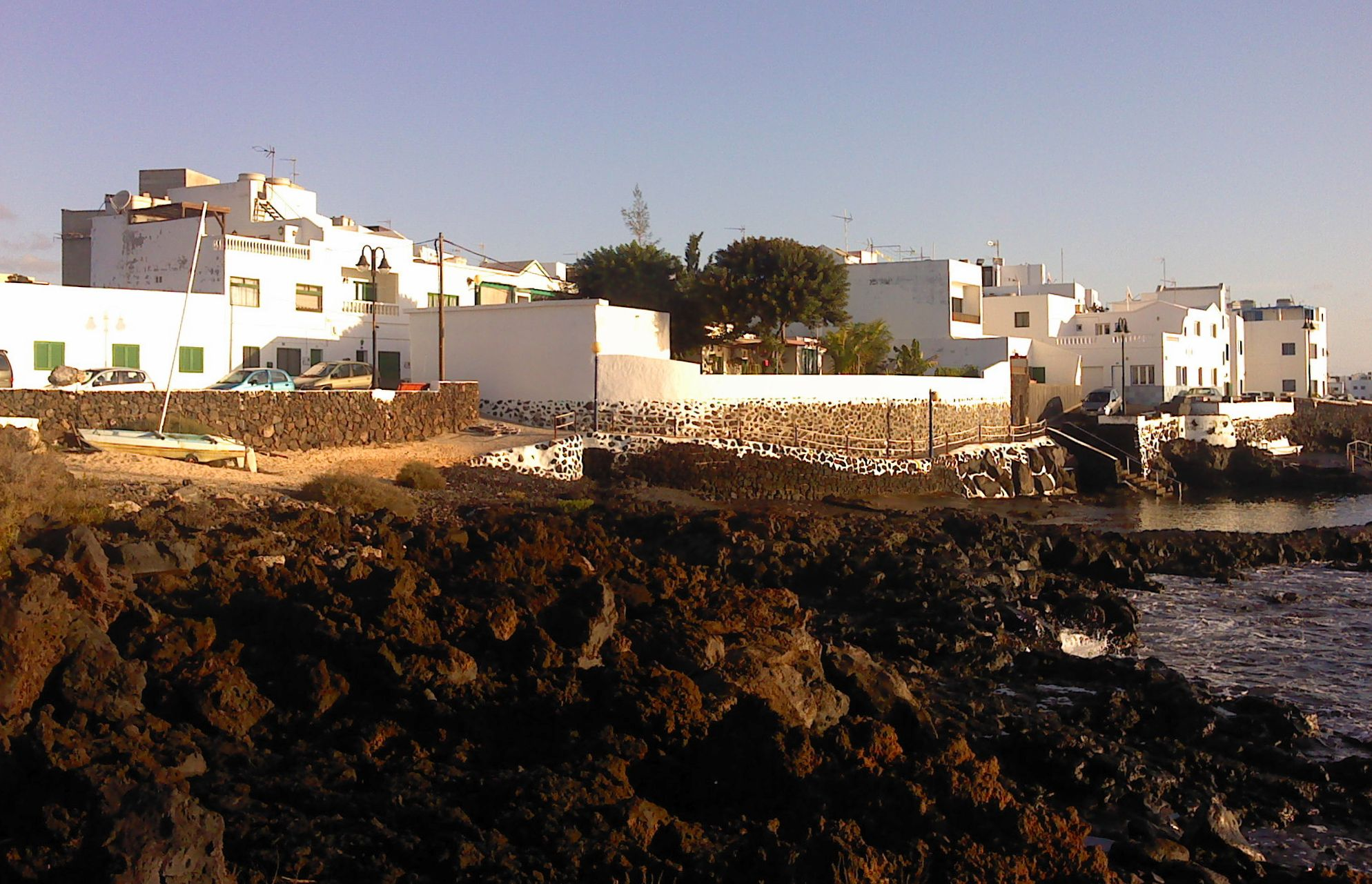
View of Punta Mujeres, Lanzarote, Canary Islands, Spain

Punta Mujeres is a village in the municipality of Haría in the Las Palmas province of northern Lanzarote in the Canary Islands.
