= Guanacaste Province =

Province of Costa Rica

Guanacaste Cuauhnacaztlán
- Province
- Provincia de Guanacaste
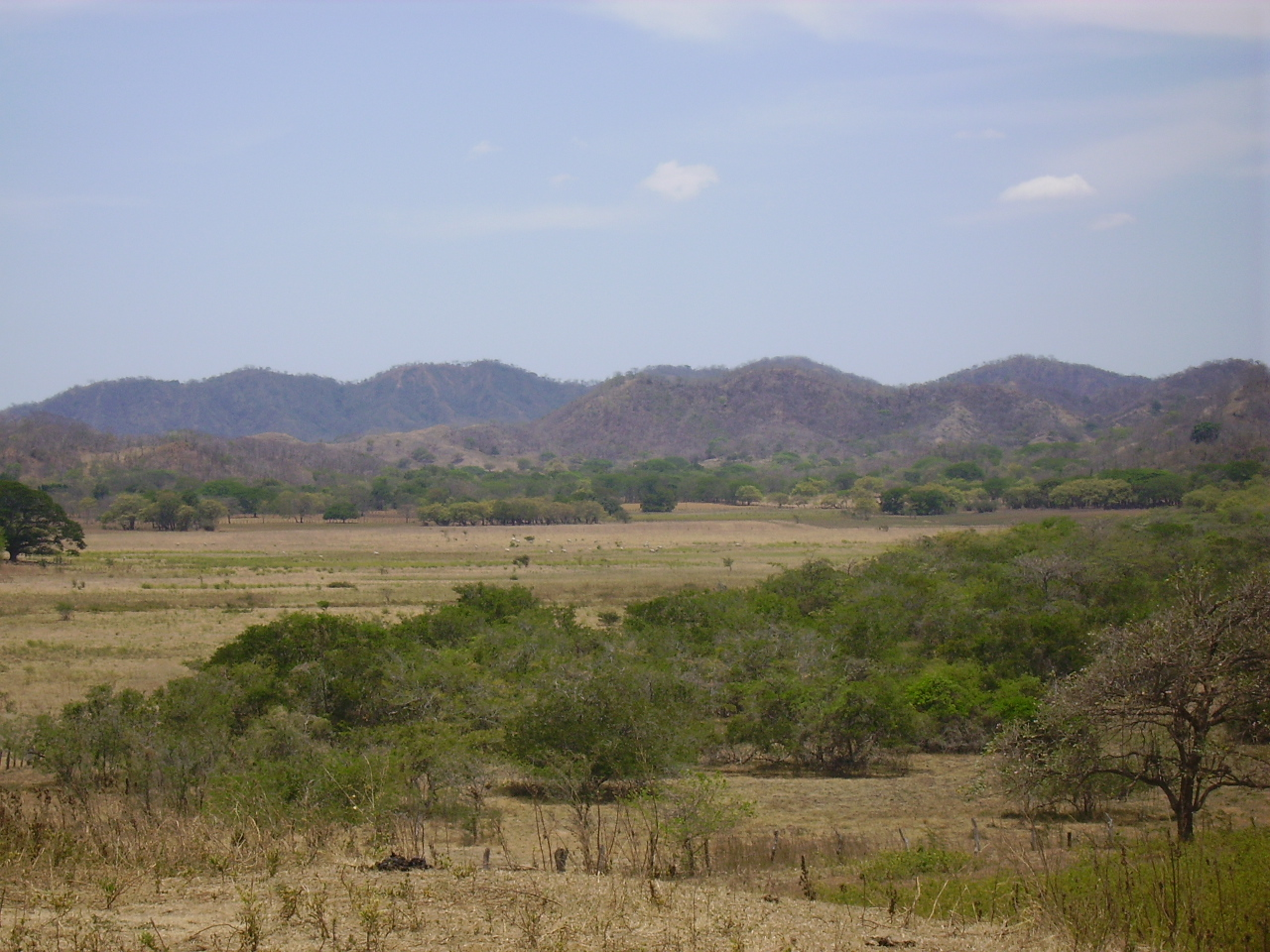
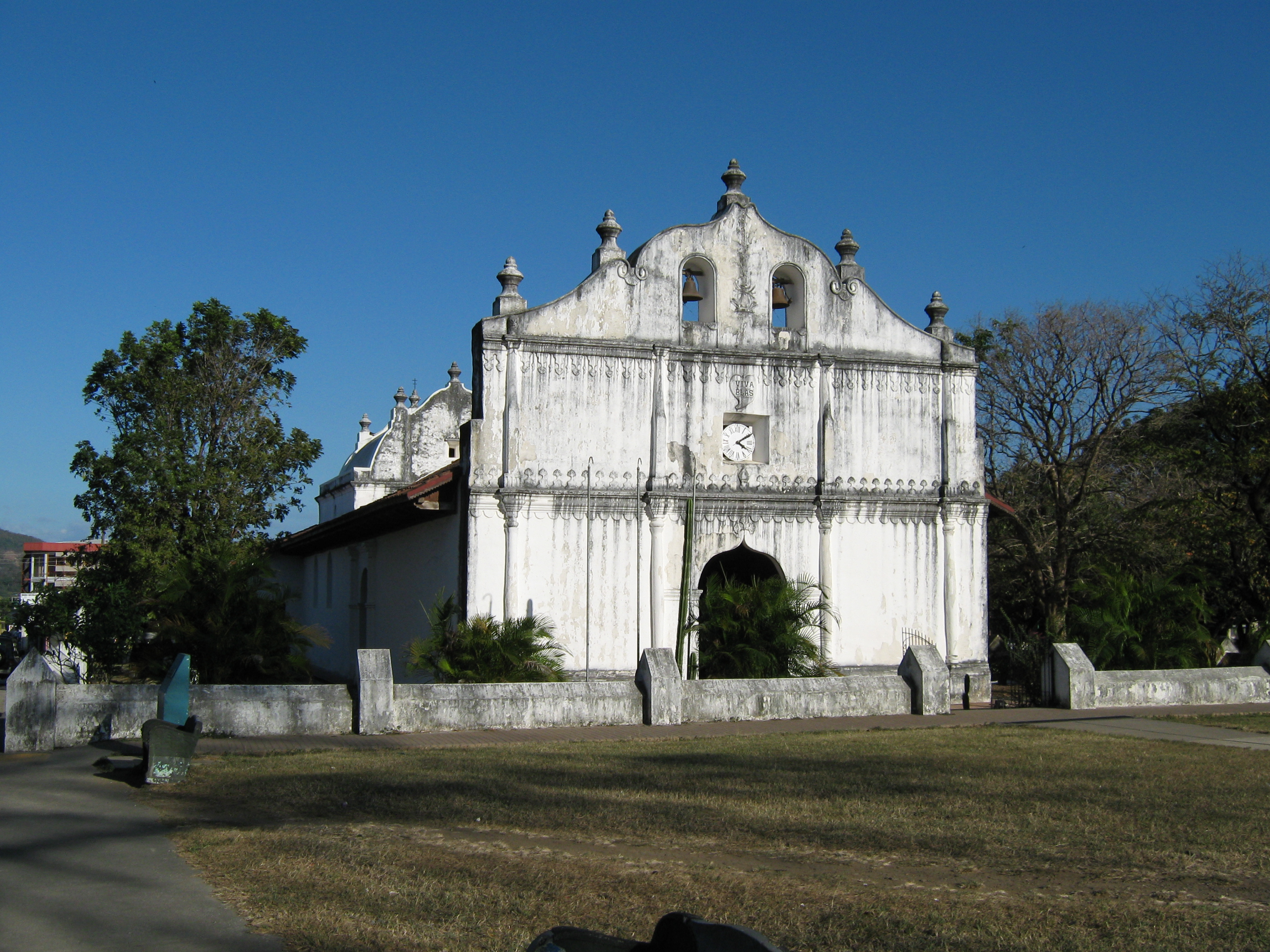
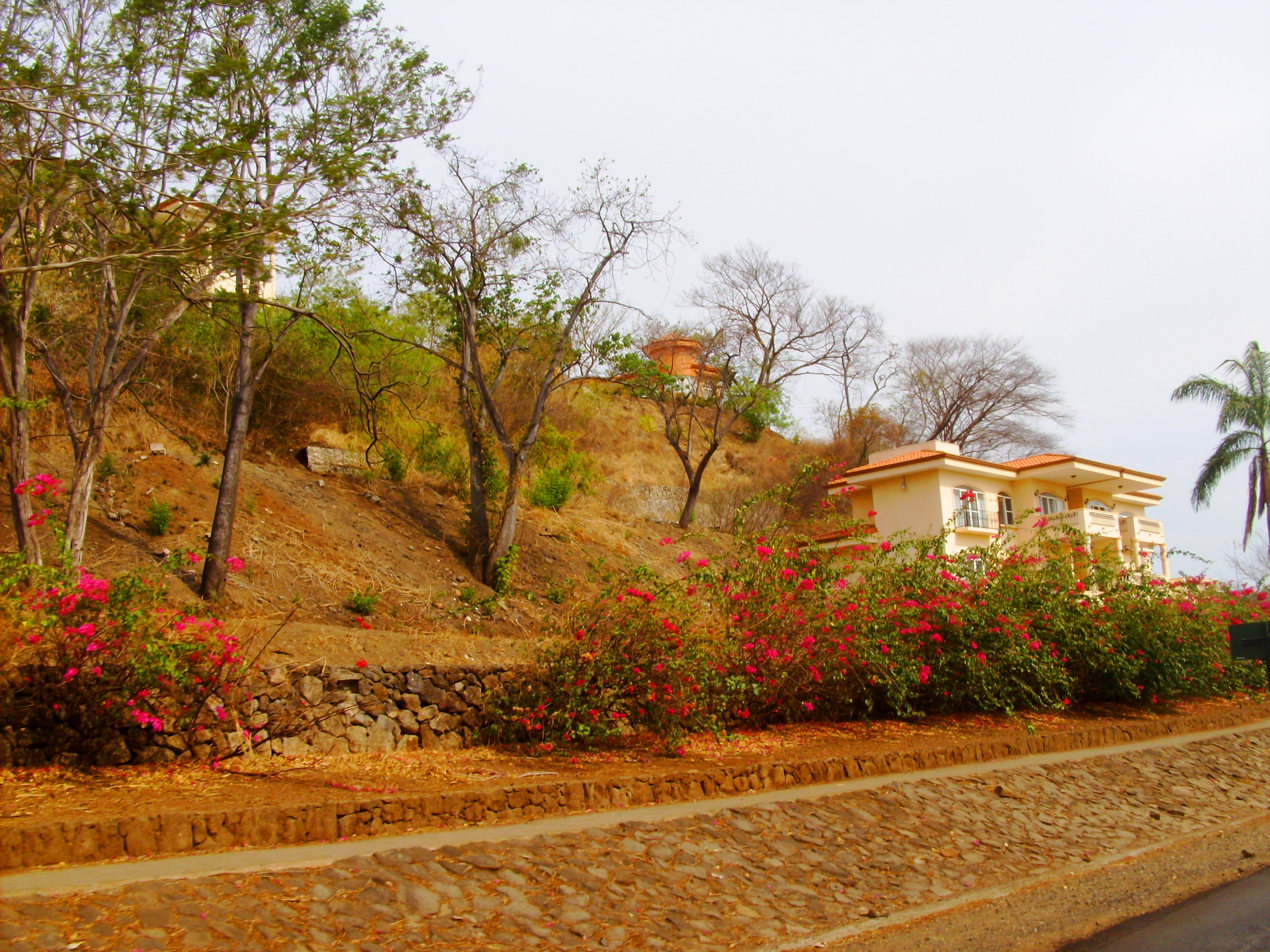
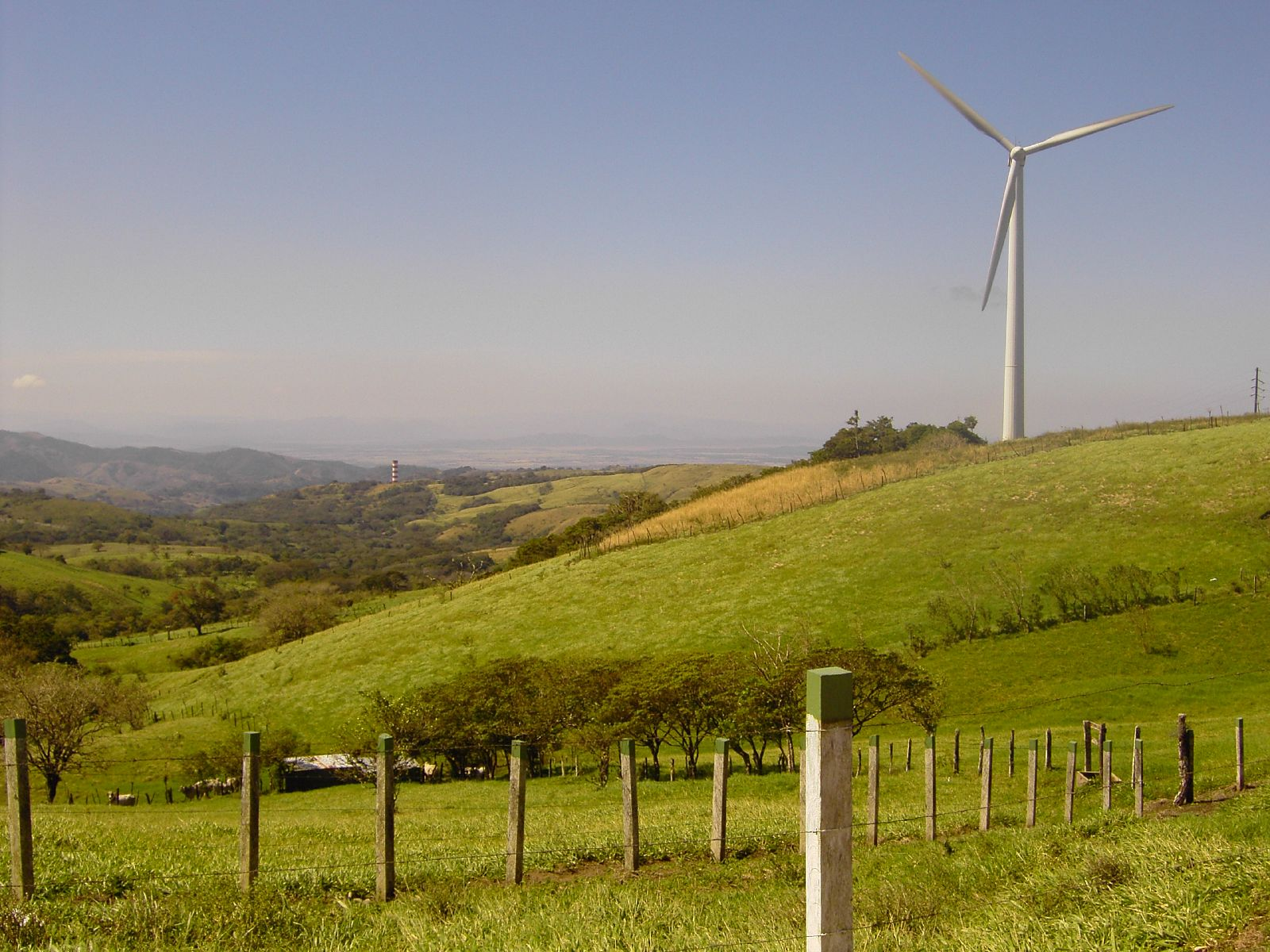
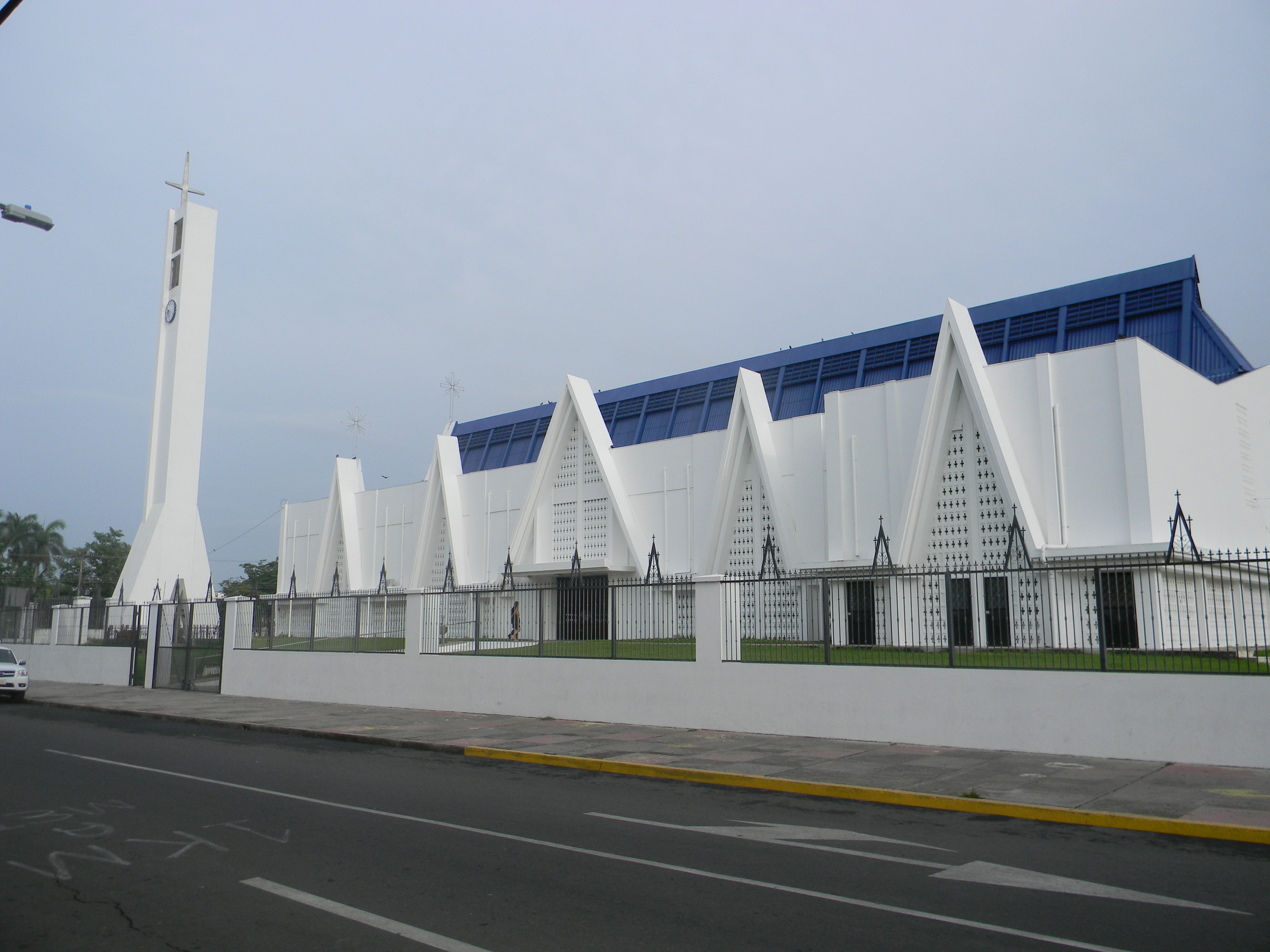
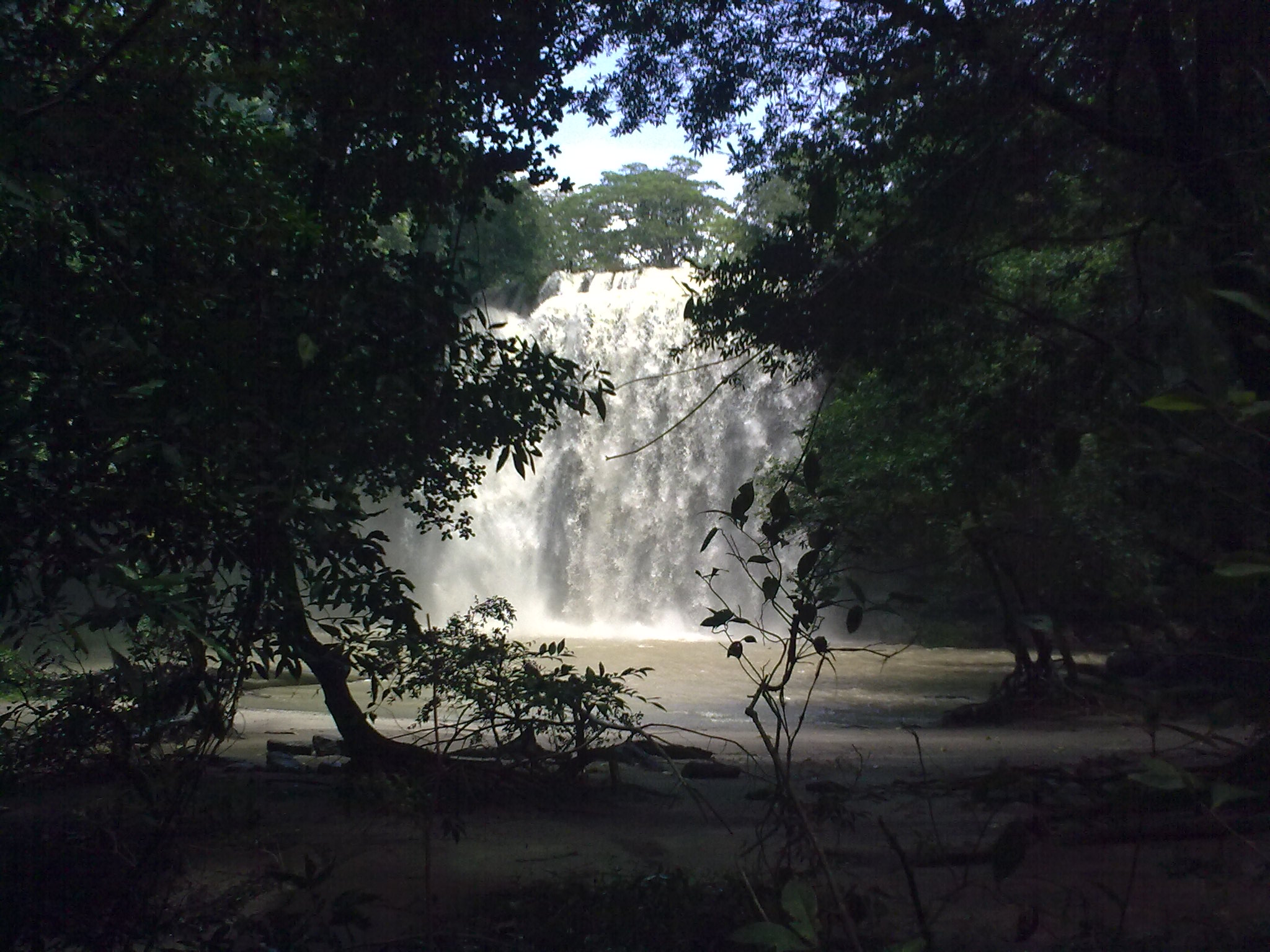
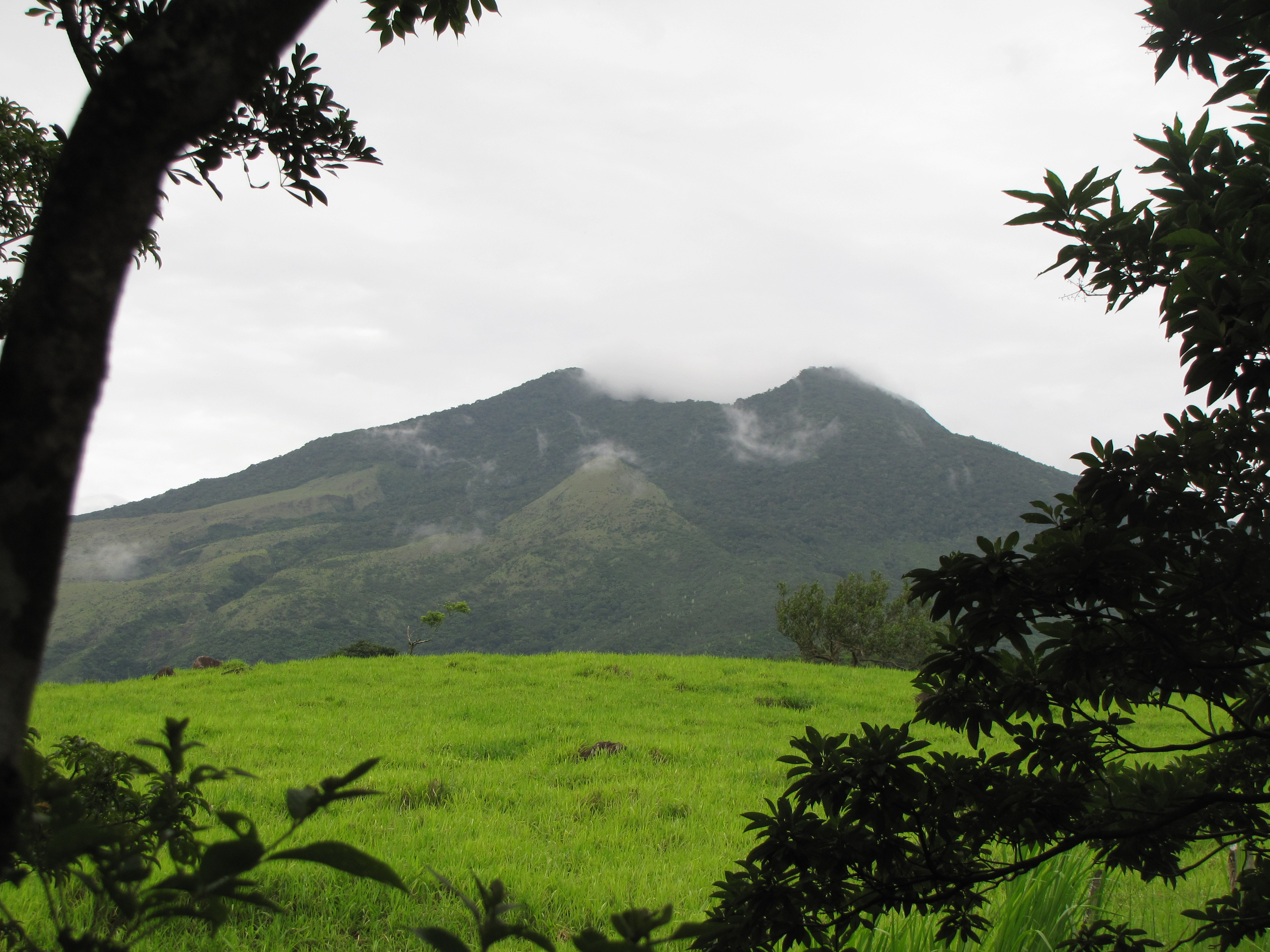
- From left to right and top to bottom: Pampa Guanacasteca, Church of San Blas de Nicoya, Playas del Coco, wind farm in Tilarán, Inmaculada Concepción de María parish, Llanos de Cortés waterfall and Miravalles Volcano

- Flag Coat of arms
- Nickname(s): Tierra de la Marimba, La Pampa
- Motto: "De la Patria por nuestra voluntad"
- Anthem: Himno de Guanacaste
- Location of the Province of Guanacaste in Costa Rica
- Country: Costa Rica
- Cantons: 11 cantons
- Districts: 61 districts
- Capital: Liberia

Government
  - Representative body: Legislative Assembly (4 deputies)

Area
  - Total: 10,140.71 km^{2} (3,915.35 sq mi)
  - Rank: 2nd
- Elevation: 90 m (300 ft)
- Highest elevation (Miravalles Volcano): 2,028 m (6,654 ft)
- Lowest elevation: 0 m (0 ft)

Population (2022)
  - Total: 404,774
  - Rank: 7th
  - Density: 39.9157/km^{2} (103.381/sq mi)
- Demonym(s): Guanacasteco, -a
- Time zone: UTC-6 (UTC-6)
- ISO 3166 code: CR-G
- HDI (2019): 0.785 — 5th (High)

Guanacaste (Spanish pronunciation: [ɡwanaˈkaste]) is a province of Costa Rica in the northwestern part of the country, along the coast of the Pacific Ocean. It is bordered by Nicaragua to the north, Alajuela Province to the east, and Puntarenas Province to the southeast. It is the most sparsely populated province in Costa Rica. Guanacaste has an area of 10,141 square kilometres (3,915 sq mi) and as of 2010, had a population of 354,154, with annual revenue of $2 billion.

Guanacaste's capital is Liberia. Other important cities include Cañas and Nicoya.

== Etymology ==
The province is named for the guanacaste tree, also known as the ear pod tree, which is the national tree of Costa Rica.

== History ==
Before the Spanish arrived, this territory was inhabited by the Chorotega people from the towns of Zapati, Nacaome, Paro, Cangel, Nicopasaya, Pocosí, Diriá, Papagayo, Namiapí, and Orosí. The Corobicies lived on the eastern shore of the Gulf of Nicoya, the Huetares in Abangares, and the Nicarao in Bagaces.

The first church was built out of grass in Nicoya in the 17th century.

In the 18th century some neighbors from Rivas, Nicaragua, established their houses and cattle farms in the northern part of the Nicoya Peninsula at crossroads that connected the towns of Bagaces, Nicoya, and Rivas. The place was named after the guanacaste trees that grow in the neighborhood.

After a plebiscite in 1824–25, Costa Rica annexed the territory of Guanacaste. In 1836, it was invaded by Nicaraguan forces and Costa Rican exiles led by Manuel Quijano, but they were repelled. The town of Guanacaste was later declared the capital of the Guanacaste province. In 1854 the town of Guanacaste was renamed Liberia.

In 2013, Nicaraguan president Daniel Ortega claimed Guanacaste province belonged to Nicaragua. Taking over Guanacaste would greatly increase the continental shelf area available to Nicaragua for oil exploration concessions, and move the Nicaraguan border to within 70 kilometres (43 mi) of Costa Rican capital San José.

== Geography ==
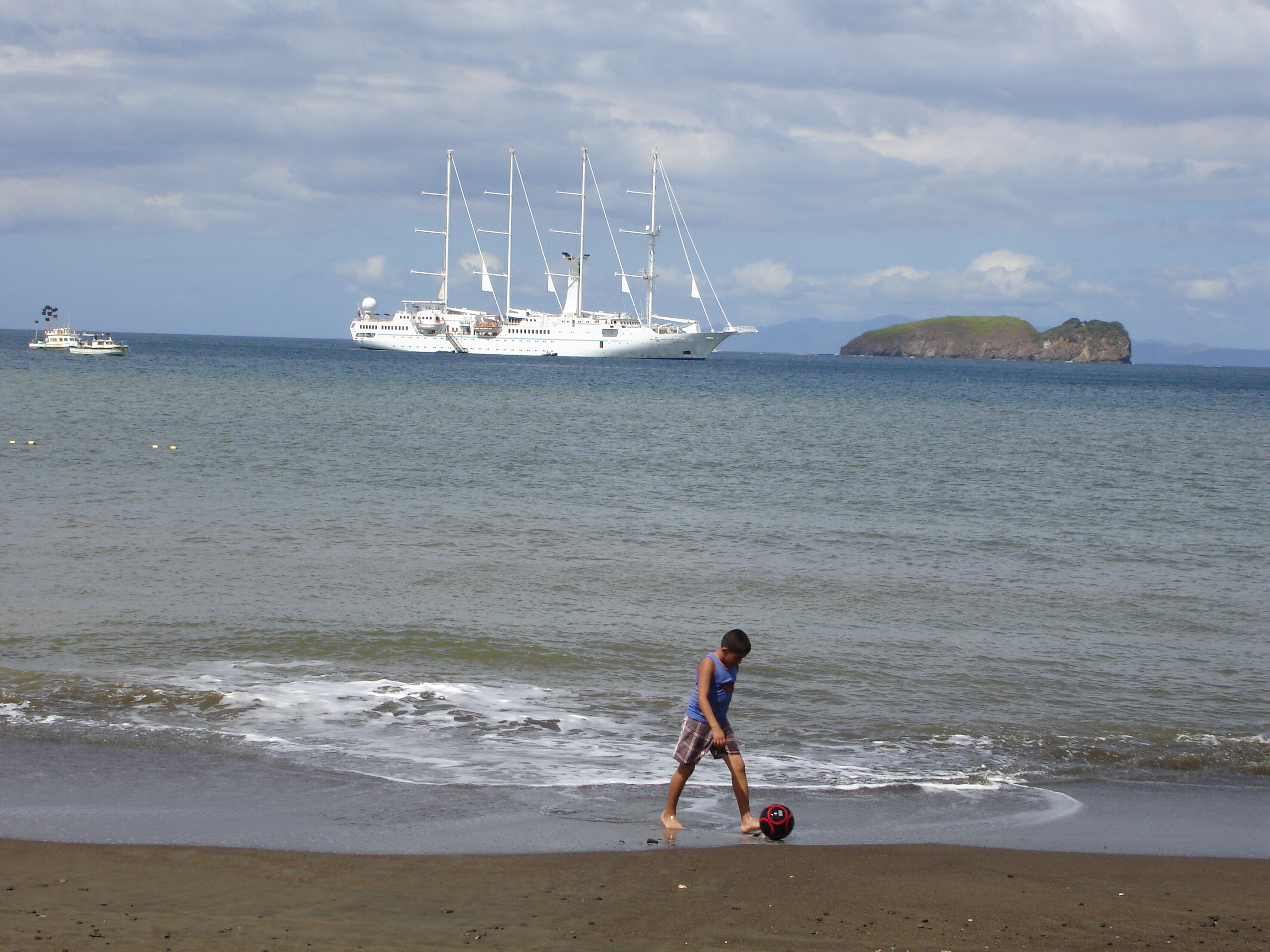
A beach in the Guanacaste Province.

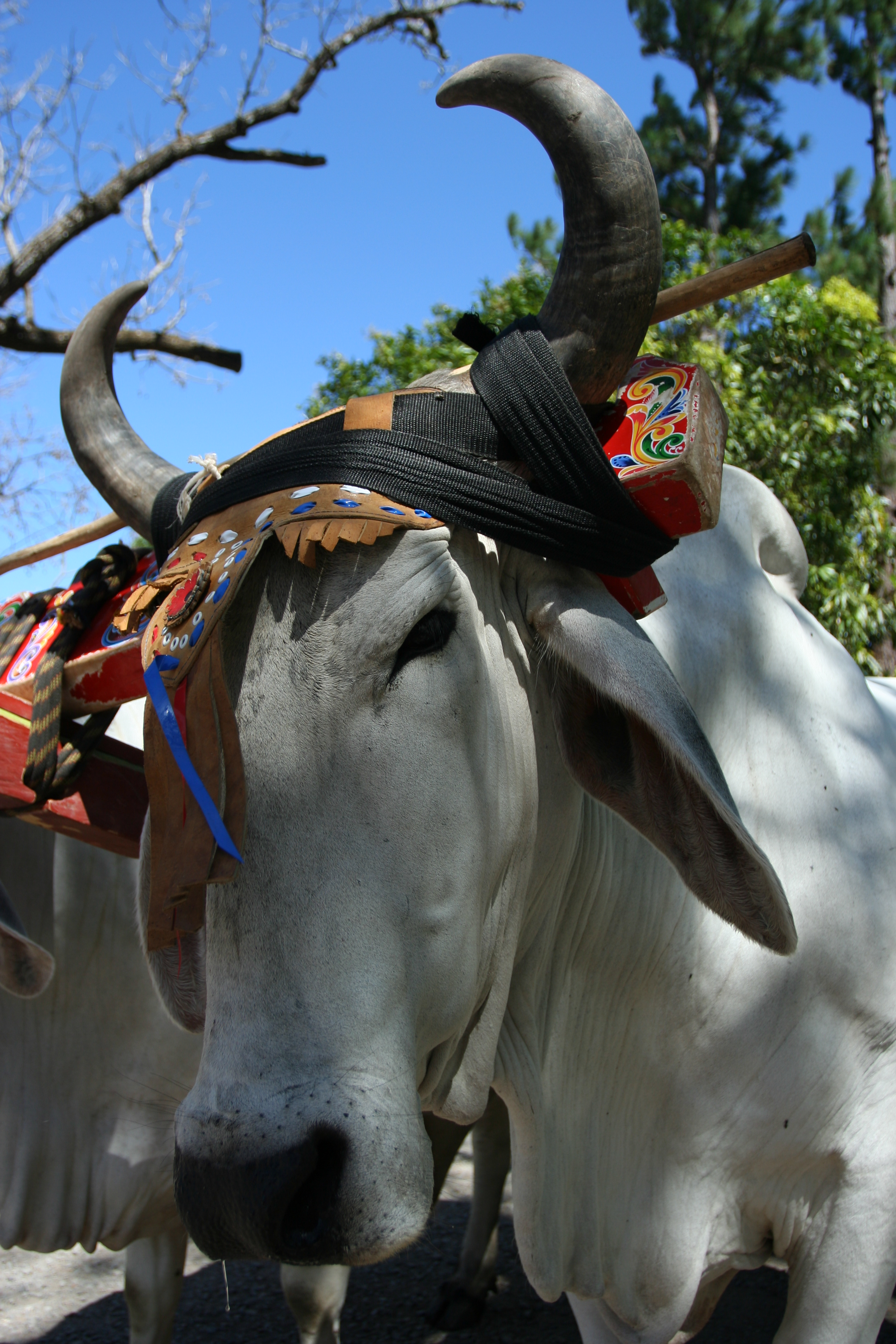
Typical headdress of Costa Rican oxen

The province is bounded on the east by a group of green-swathed volcanoes forming the Cordillera de Guanacaste (which features Orosi, Rincón de la Vieja, Miravalles and Tenorio volcanoes) and the Cordillera de Tilarán. The rivers that tumble out of these steep mountains flow down to rolling flatlands, forming a vast alluvial plain drained by the Rio Tempisque, which empties through swampy wetlands into the Golfo de Nicoya. The Rio Tempisque defines one side of the horsehead-shaped Península de Nicoya enclosing the gulf to the west.

=== Climate ===
Guanacaste's climate and culture are unique among Costa Rican provinces. The province experiences little rain and consistent heat from November to April, resulting in ubiquitous tropical dry forests as a natural adaption to the dry season conditions. Tourists seek out this dry heat during the North American winter to enjoy the Guanacastecan beaches. Irrigation of the agricultural land is necessary during the long dry period. From May to October, the climate is similar to that of San José, consisting of showers daily and moderate temperatures. Guanacaste is, however, considerably warmer than other provinces in the country located in higher elevations.

== Tourism ==
Tourism spreads across Guanacaste's 10,141 square kilometres (3,915 sq mi) and more than 640 km (400 mi) of coast line. Tourist attractions include water, land, mountains, volcanoes, and coastal ecosystems. The two main commercial areas are Santa Cruz and Liberia, with six surrounding tourism development centers: Papagayo Peninsula, El Coco, Las Catalinas, Flamingo, Conchal, and Tamarindo. Liberia is central to the six and has an airport. The animal rehab center Centro de Rescate Las Pumas is in the heart of Area de Conservación Guanacaste World Heritage Site. Guanacaste is home to the bulk of Costa Rica's all-inclusive resorts.

== Demographics ==
Most of the population descends from Chorotega Natives and Spaniards, with some Africans as a result of a large number of slaves working the land during the colonial period. As in Nicaragua and elsewhere in Costa Rica, Usted is the form of address used by Guanacastecans upon initial meetings and typically among adults. The vos verb-form is used mainly when adults address children, especially their own, and occasionally between adults who are family members or good friends.

Chorotega and Spanish culture have successfully integrated; among the main cultural elements are their music, literature (folklore), musical instruments, bullfighting, and religious events.

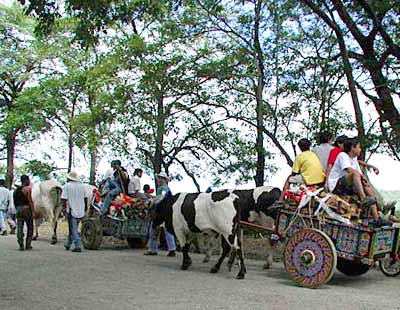
Typical Costa Rican ox-drawn carts carry wood during an annual festival in Nicoya, Guanacaste.

== Economy ==
The province has an economic and cultural heritage based on beef cattle ranching. Most of the area is covered by small patches of forest, scattered trees and large pastures of coarse grasses where Brahman cattle and related breeds graze. Historically, Guanacaste's main source of revenue was cattle ranching, but it is declining due to an international drop in the demand for beef. Many pastures are naturally reverting to dry forest or being converted to tree plantations.

Other agricultural products of importance in Guanacaste are sugar cane and cotton, and since the late 1980s, with the creation of a large-scale irrigation program (the water comes from Lake Arenal after passing through several power generating stations), rice.

Since the late 20th century, tourism has emerged as a significant part of Guanacaste's economy, thanks to the combination of beaches like Playas del Coco, Playa Tamarindo, and the sunny dry season that coincides with the winter months in northern latitudes. Many tourists are also attracted by the province's seven national parks, including Santa Rosa, Guanacaste and Rincon de la Vieja National Parks.

== Political divisions ==
Guanacaste is divided into eleven cantons. The cantons (with their capitals in parentheses) are:

1. Liberia (Liberia)
2. Nicoya (Nicoya)
3. Santa Cruz (Santa Cruz)
4. Bagaces (Bagaces)
5. Carrillo (Filadelfia)
6. Cañas (Cañas)
7. Abangares (Las Juntas)
8. Tilarán (Tilarán)
9. Nandayure (Carmona)
10. La Cruz (La Cruz)
11. Hojancha (Hojancha)

Much of the peninsula of Nicoya is under the jurisdiction of the province of Puntarenas. This may change, as there is constant debate over the remapping of the area.

== See also ==
- Gulf of Nicoya
- Nicoya Peninsula
- Partido de Nicoya
- Independent Guanacaste Party
- Area de Conservación Guanacaste World Heritage Site
- Guanacaste Day
