= Casas Las Escarnas =

Village in northern Lanzarote, Canary Islands

Casas Las Escarnas is a village in the municipality of Haría in the Las Palmas province of northern Lanzarote in the Canary Islands.
