= Mala, Lanzarote =

Human settlement in Spain

Coordinates: 29.0980°N 13.4680°W

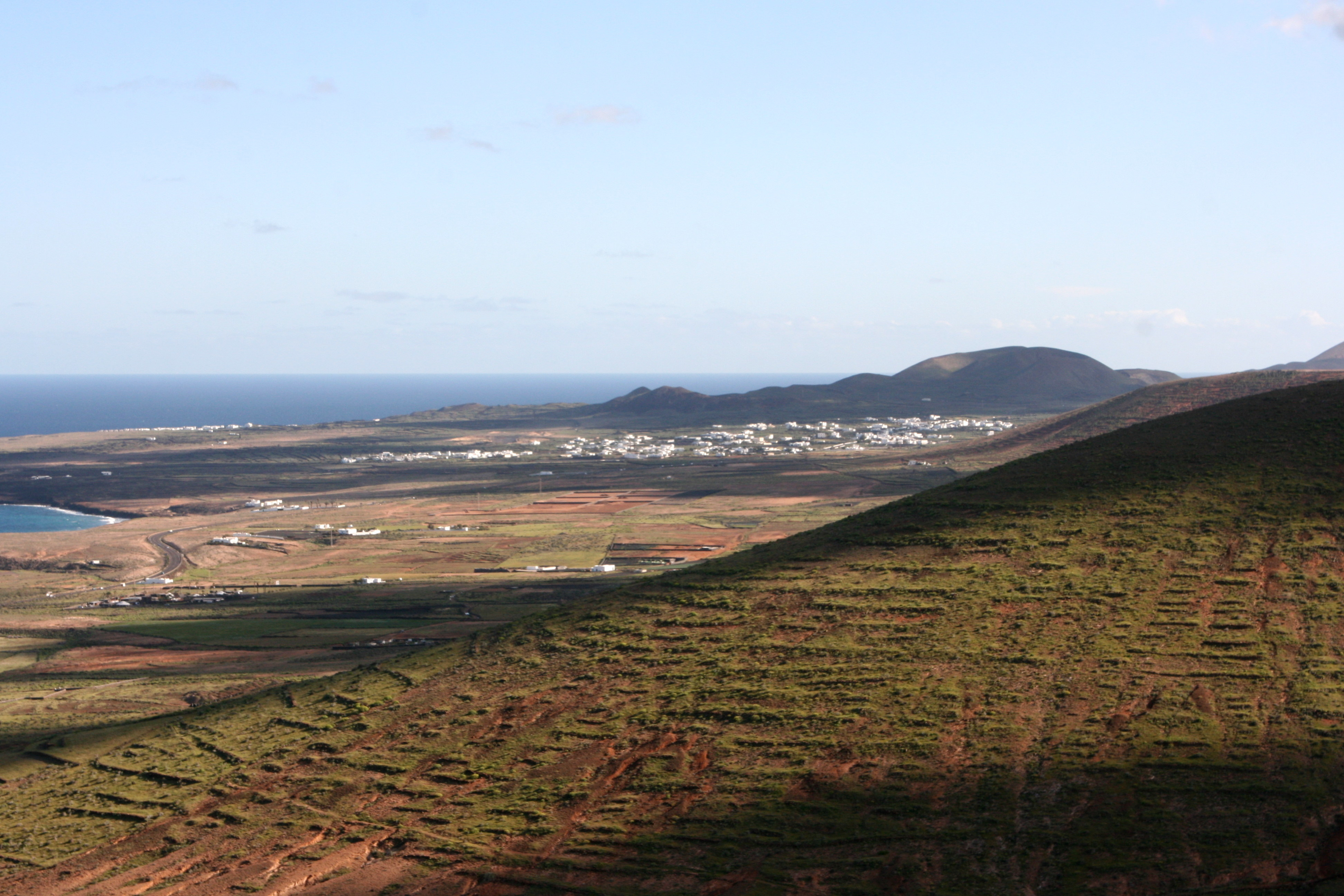
View towards Mala from the north

Mala is a village in the municipality of Haría on Lanzarote in the province of Las Palmas in the Canary Islands. Its population in 2012 was 533.

The village's economy is based around tourism and agriculture (principally rearing of cochineal beetles in fields of opuntia cactus).

Its nearest neighbours are the villages of Guatiza and Charco del Palo, both about 3 km away. Mala is served by two regular bus routes between Lanzarote's capital Arrecife and the north of the island (Órzola and Máguez).
