= Mágues =

Municipality village

Coordinates: 29.159°N 13.494°W

Mágues is a village in the municipality of Haría in the Las Palmas province of northern Lanzarote in the Canary Islands.
