= Centro de Rescate Las Pumas =

Costa Rican rural park

- Las Pumas Rescue Center
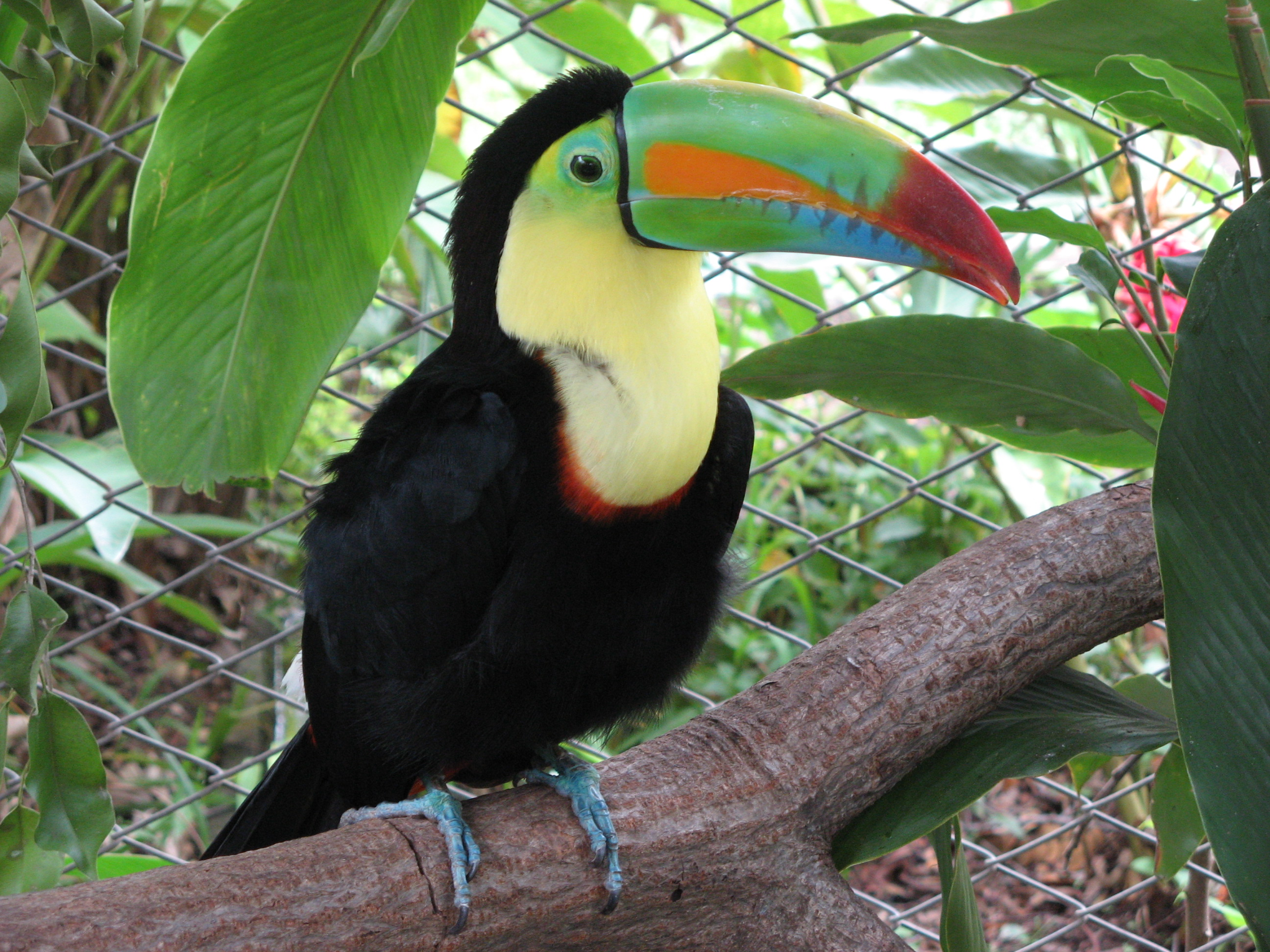
- Keel-billed toucan in display at the Cat zoo
- Interactive map of Centro de Rescate Las Pumas
- Type: Urban park, zoo.
- Location: Guanacaste Province, Costa Rica
- Coordinates: 10°18′58″N 84°49′22″W
- Created: 1960s
- Operator: Fundación Hognauer
- Status: Open all year

Centro de Rescate Las Pumas (Las Pumas Rescue Center) is a rural park of approximately 14 hectares (35 acres), located in southern Cañas, in the Guanacaste Province, Costa Rica.

The Las Pumas (cat) Rescue Center is located in an old farm land called Hacienda La Pacifica, in the heart of Area de Conservación Guanacaste World Heritage Site. Most animals are brought to the Rescue Center by government officials, rescued from human interaction. After rehabilitation, many species are reintroduced to the wild with approval of veterinary care.

== See also ==
- List of zoos by country: Costa Rica zoos
