= Monte Corona =

Mountain in Lanzarote, Canary Islands

Coordinates: 29.184°N 13.4835°W

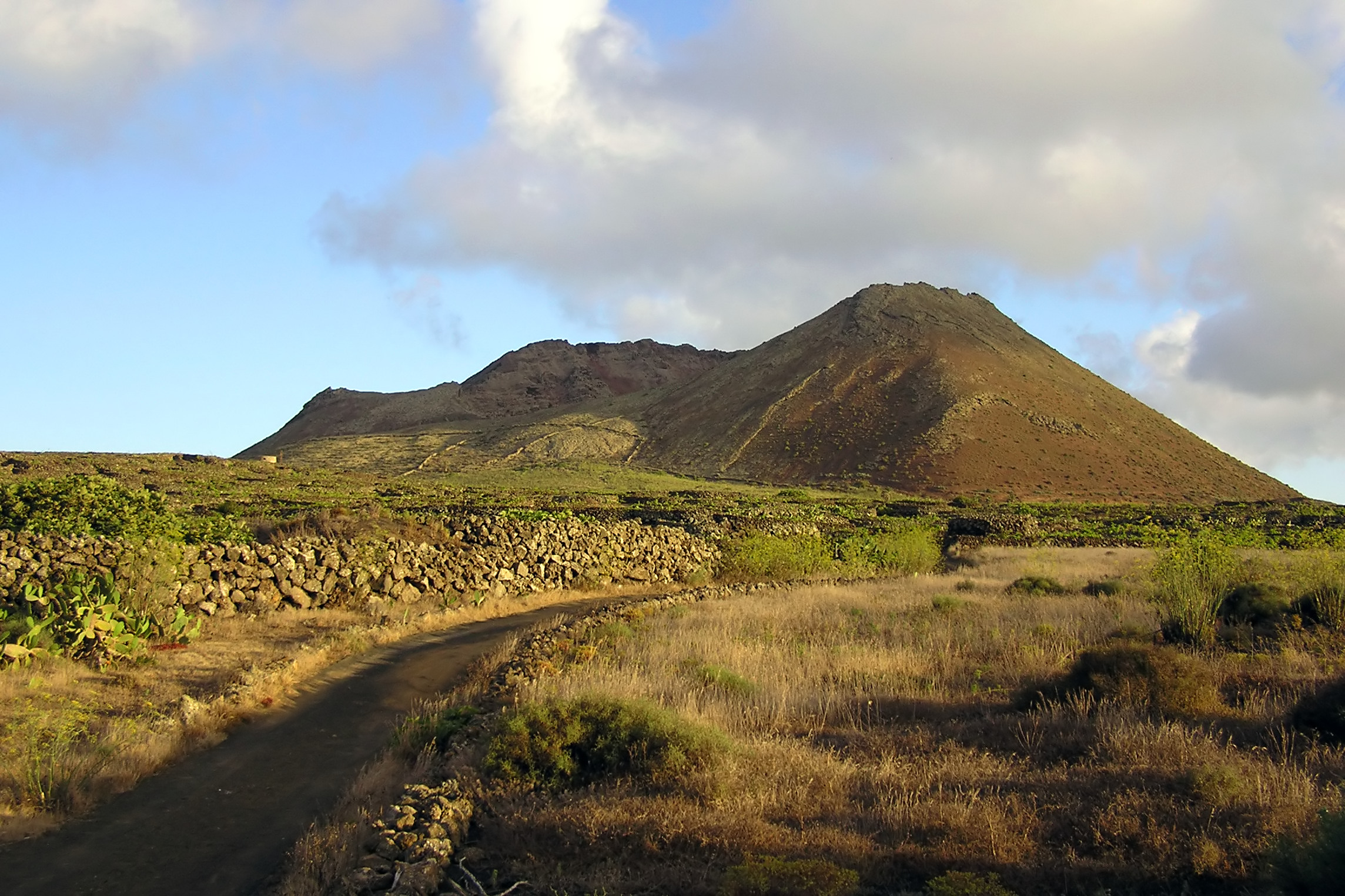
Mount Corona, viewed from Yé.

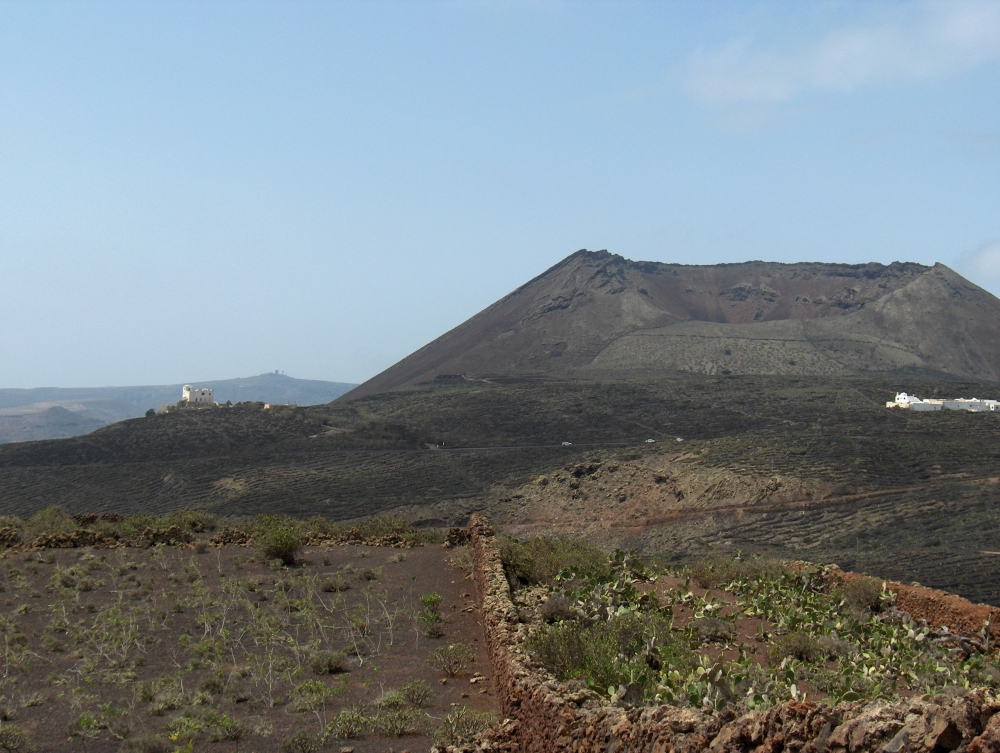
Mount Corona, viewed from La Quemada de Orzola

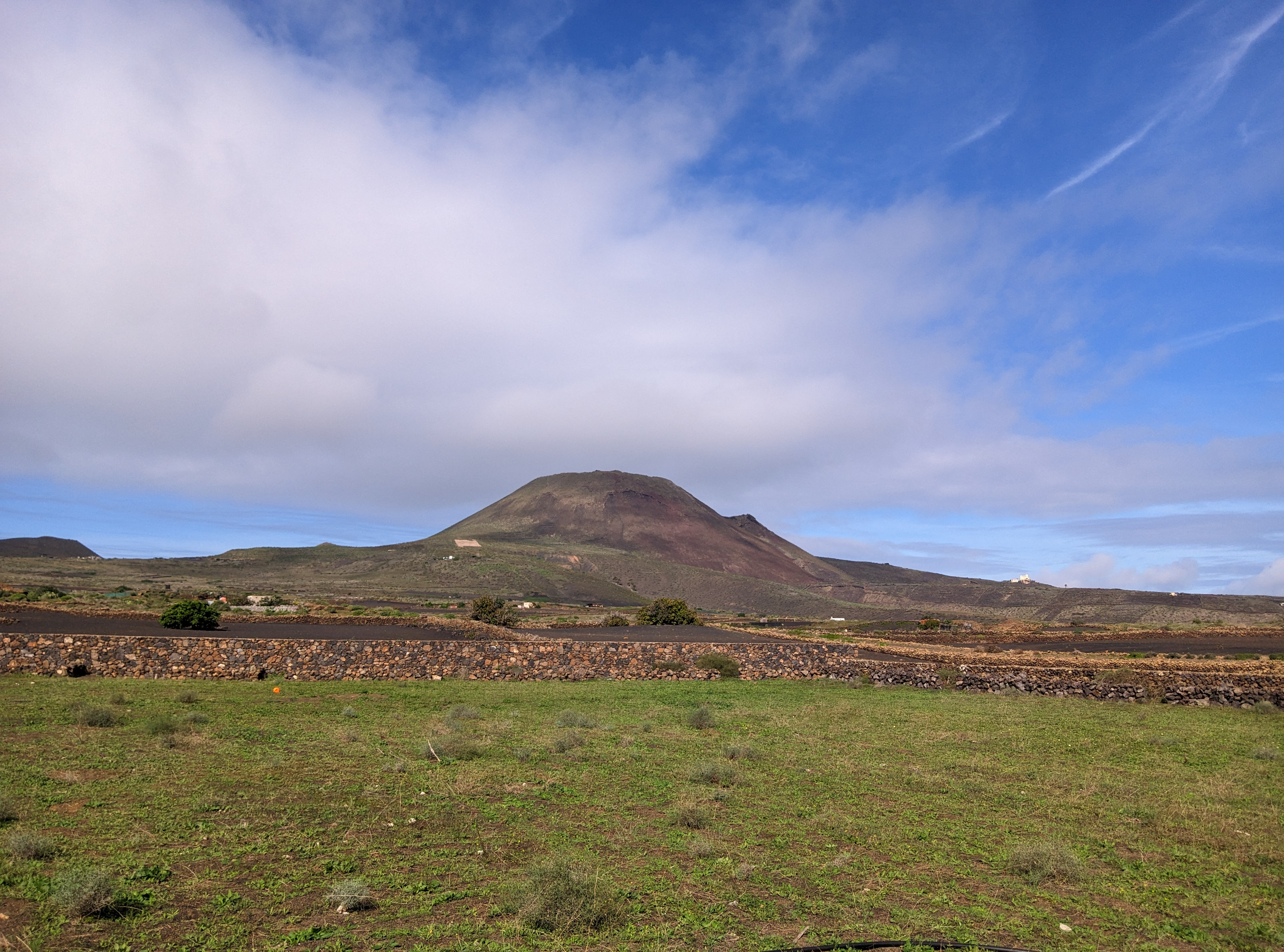
Mount Corona viewed from Máguez

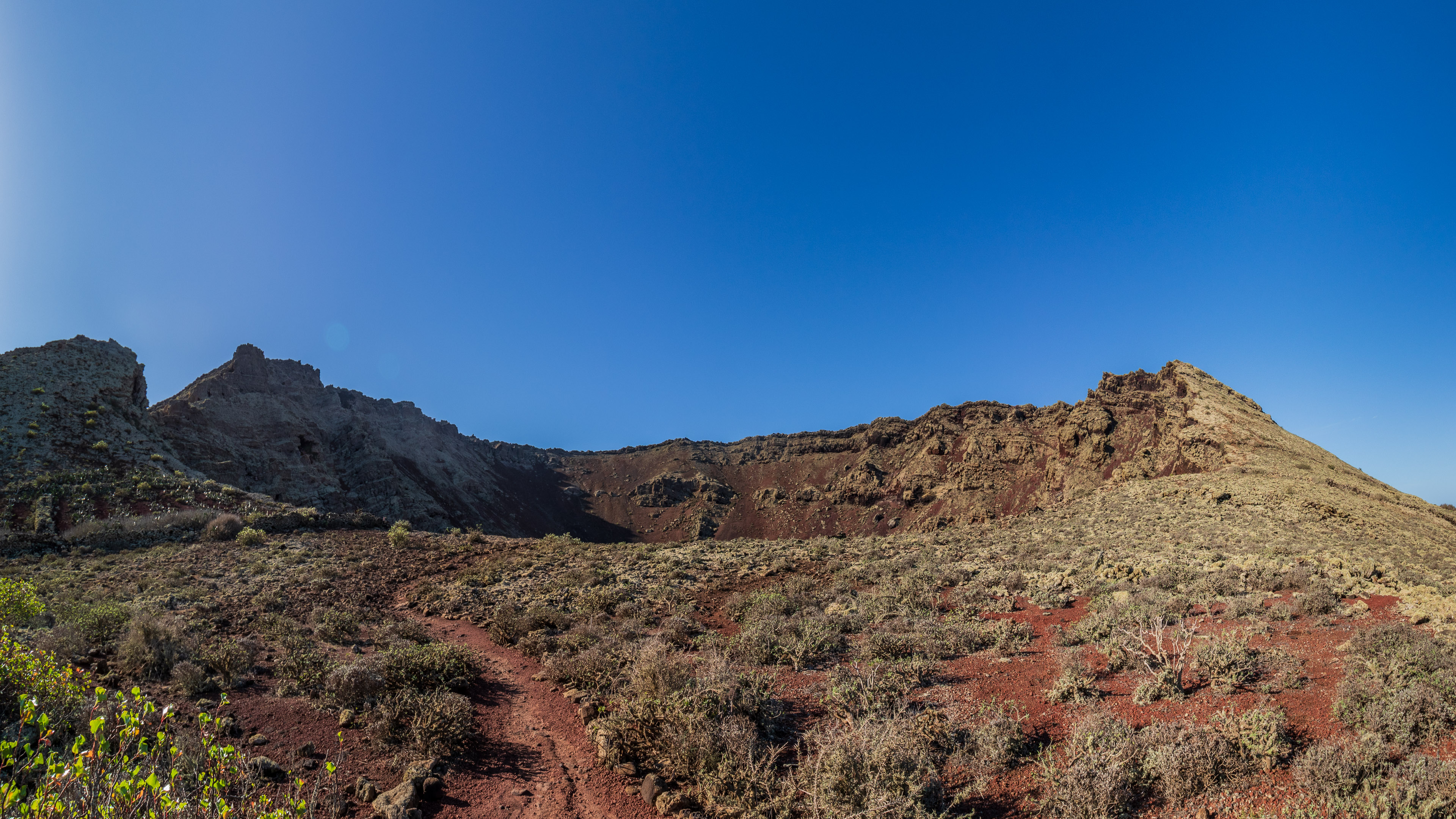
Caldera of Mount Corona

Volcán de La Corona is a 609 meters (1,998 ft) high extinct volcano on the Canary Island of Lanzarote (Spain), near the village of Yé in the municipality of Haría. Its eruption, around 21,000 years ago, covered a large area of the northeast of the island with lava, creating the Malpais de la Corona and two of the island's most-visited geological attractions, the Cueva de los Verdes and the Jameos del Agua.
