= Gulf of Papagayo =

Body of water off the northwestern coast of Costa Rica

Coordinates: 10.7°N 85.8°W

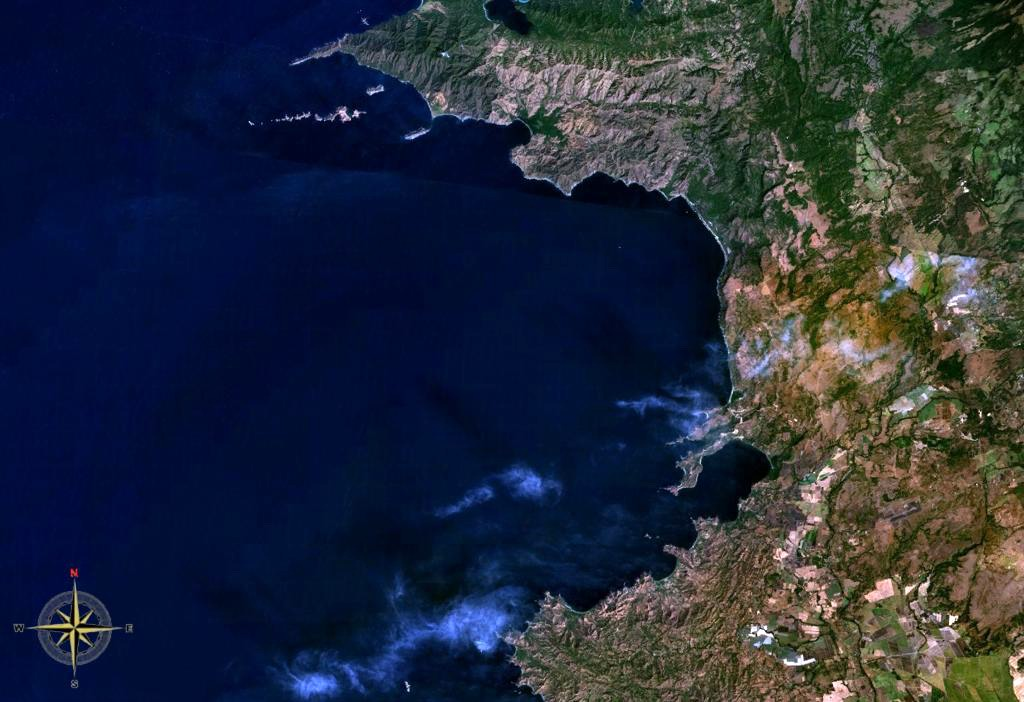
Gulf of Papagayo seen from space

The Gulf of Papagayo (Spanish: Golfo del Papagayo, meaning "gulf of the parrot") is a large body of water off Guanacaste province and the northwestern coast of Costa Rica. It is an embayment of the Pacific Ocean. The Gulf has a maximum depth of approximately 100 metres (330 ft). The Gulf contains Culebra Bay in the south.

The Gulf and its coastline are part of a major tourism project by Costa Rica's government that began in 1972. Among the most popular destinations on the Gulf of Papagayo are Ocotal Beach, Playas del Coco, Playa Hermosa, and Playa Panama. The Papagayo Peninsula is the most developed area in the gulf region. The gulf waters are home to many wildlife including orcas. The International Game Fish Association world record mahi-mahi (Coryphaena hippurus) was caught in the Papagayo Gulf in 1976, weighing 87 pounds (39.46 kg).

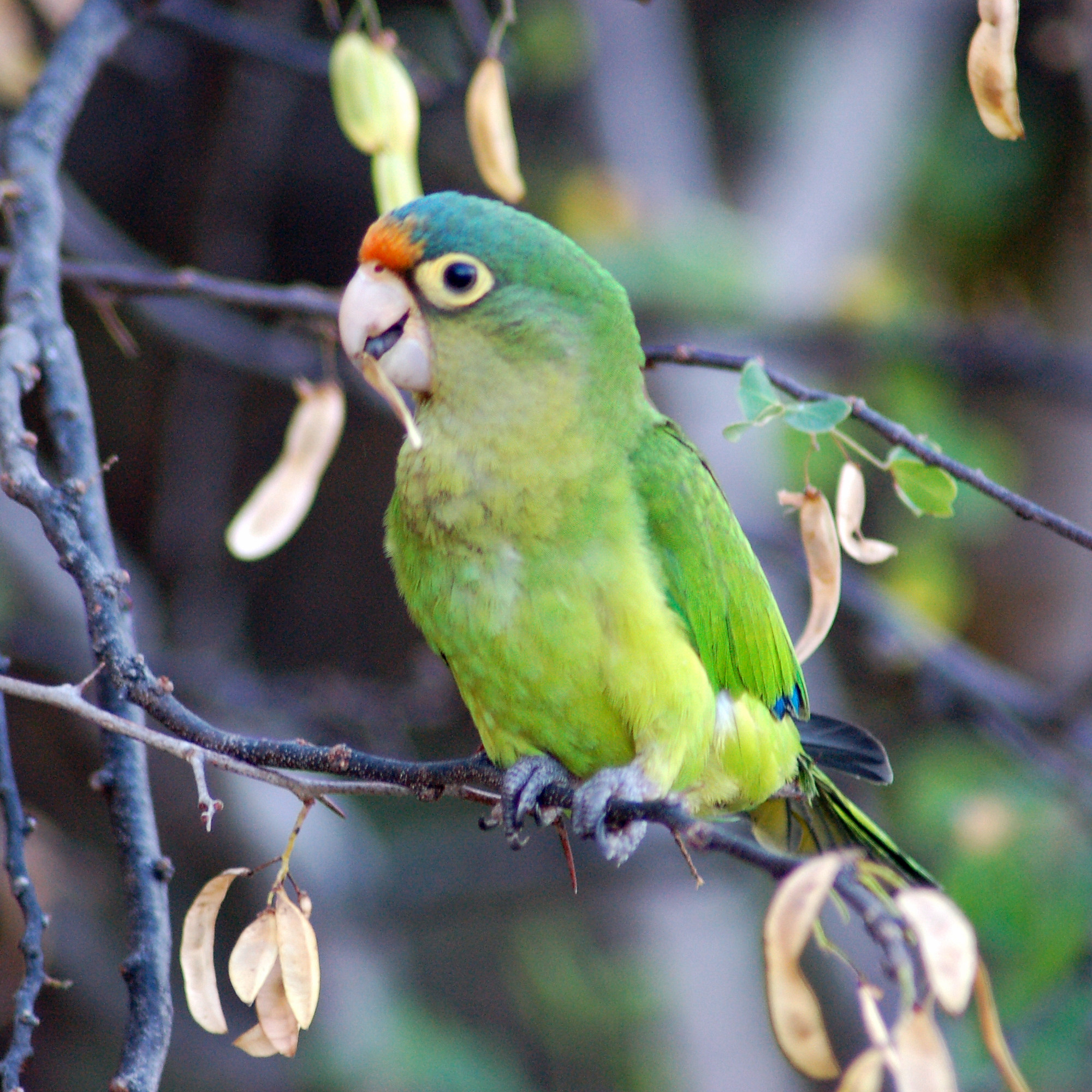
A wild orange-fronted parakeet, orange-fronted conure, or half-moon conure (Aratinga canicularis) near a beach facing the Gulf of Papagayo
