= Guinate =

Coordinates: 29.1808°N 13.4947°W

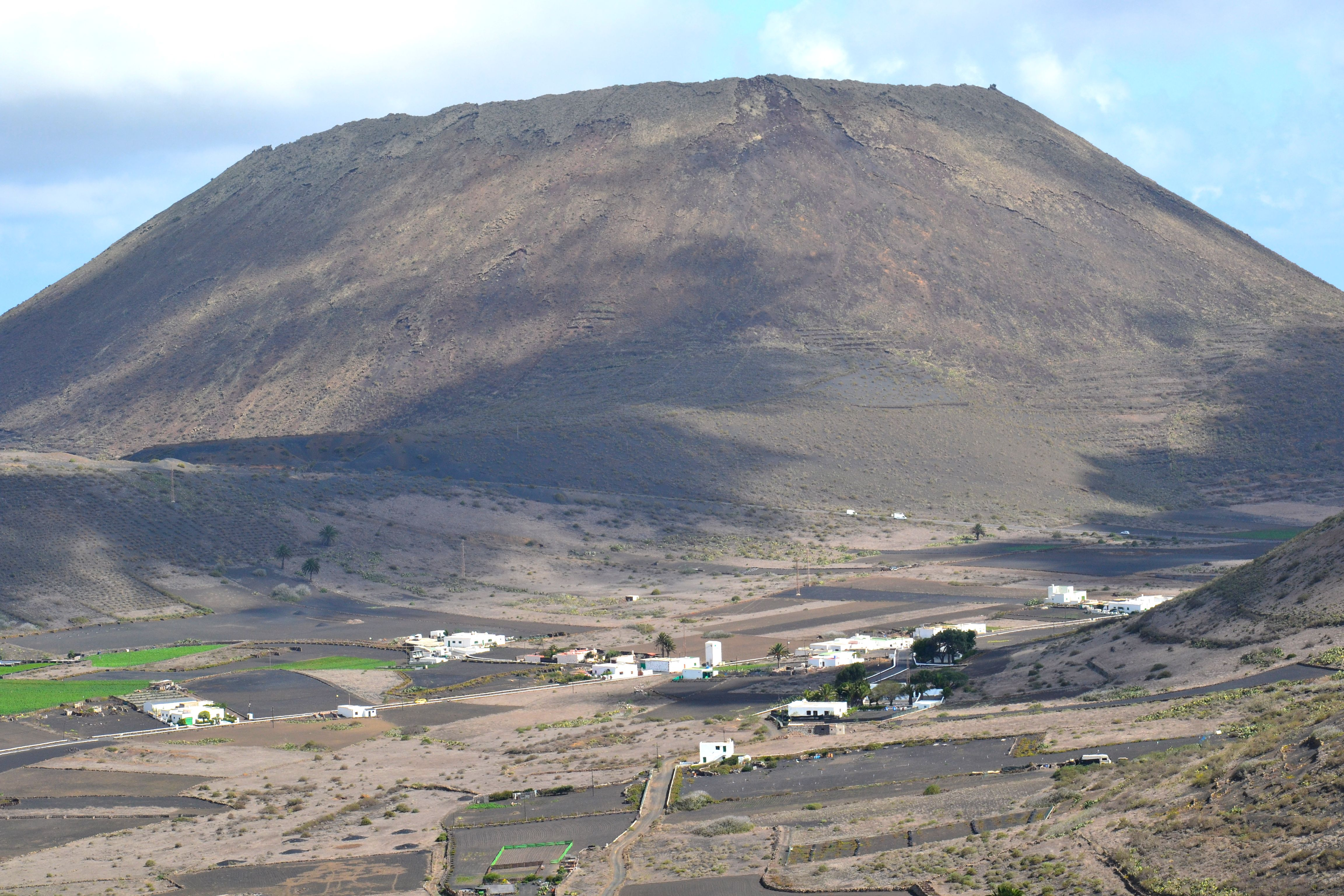
Montaña de los Helechos

Guinate is a village in the municipality of Haría in northern Lanzarote in the Las Palmas province of Spain (the Eastern Canary Islands).

The village used to have a large (45000 m^{2}) tropical park which had numerous bird species, including penguins, and many plants and animals but this closed several years ago. On the coast there is El Mirador de Guinate which has fine views of the coast and of several small islands.
