= Arrieta, Lanzarote =

Arrieta
- village
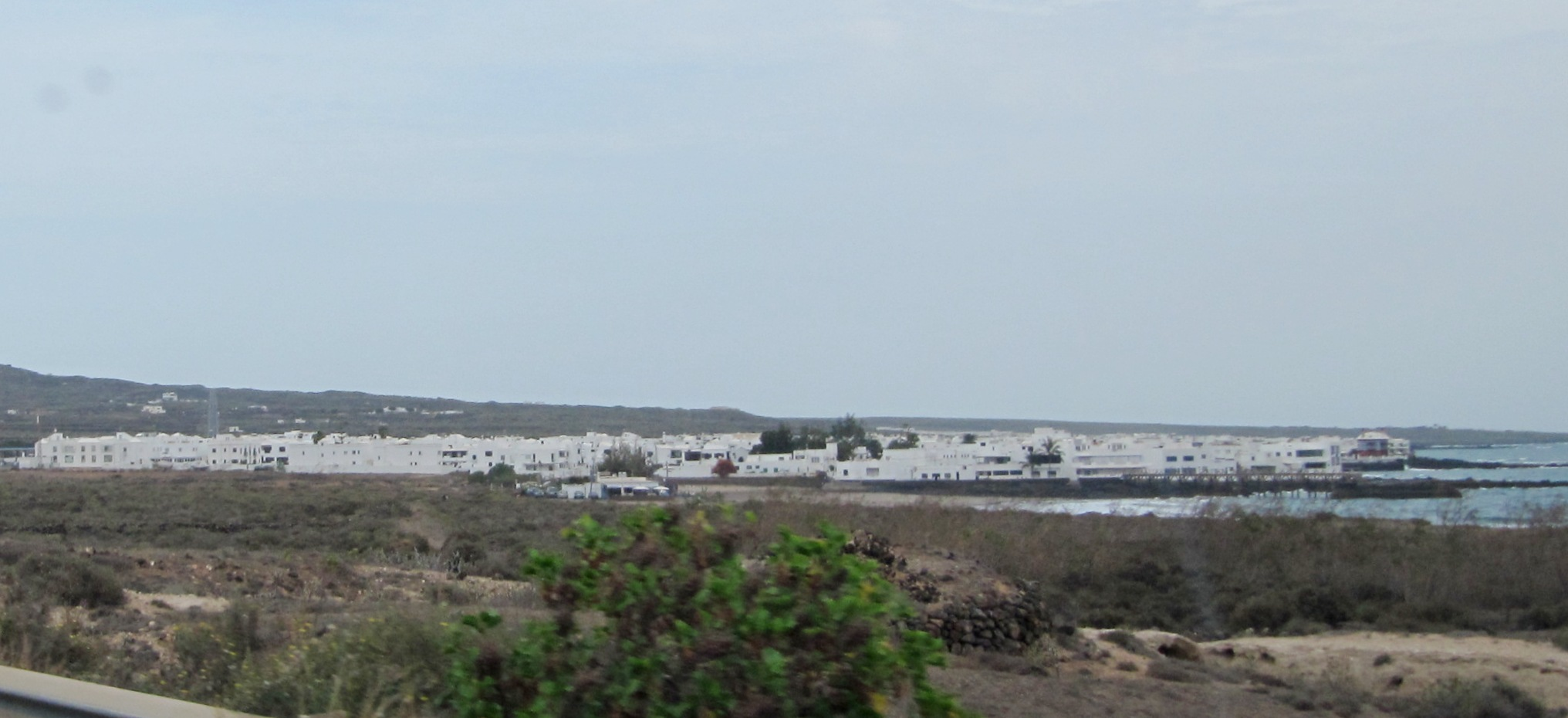

- Location in Lanzarote
- Coordinates: 29°7′54.11″N 13°27′42.69″W
- Country: Spain
- Autonomous Community: Canary Islands
- Province: Las Palmas
- Island: Lanzarote
- Municipality: Haría
- Elevation: 10 m (33 ft)

Population (2021)
  - Total: 1,064
- Time zone: UTC±00:00 (WET)
  - Summer (DST): UTC+01:00 (WEST)
- Postal code: 35542
- Area code: +34 (Spain) + 928 (Las Palmas)

Arrieta is a small coastal village on the municipality of Haría, which is the northernmost municipality of island of Lanzarote (Spain/Canary Islands). In 2021, the population of Arrieta was of 1064 inhabitants. The beach (playa "La Garita") is famous and very popular among locals and tourists. As a tourist destination it is pretty crowded in the seasons and there are amenities for ~2000 guests in the direct vicinity of Arrieta.

The name refers to the capital of the municipality, Haría, and means 'the small Haría'.

The "playa de La Garita" is about 810 m wide and consists of white sand (in contrary to the rocky beaches and beaches with black sand on Lanzarote). Some of the locals still live their lives as fishermen and maintain historic traditions.

There is a small "Museum" on the topic of Aloe Vera - a plant that is used to make beauty culture, cosmetics and anti-inflammatory products.
