= Charco del Palo =

Village of Lanzarote, Canary Islands

- Village
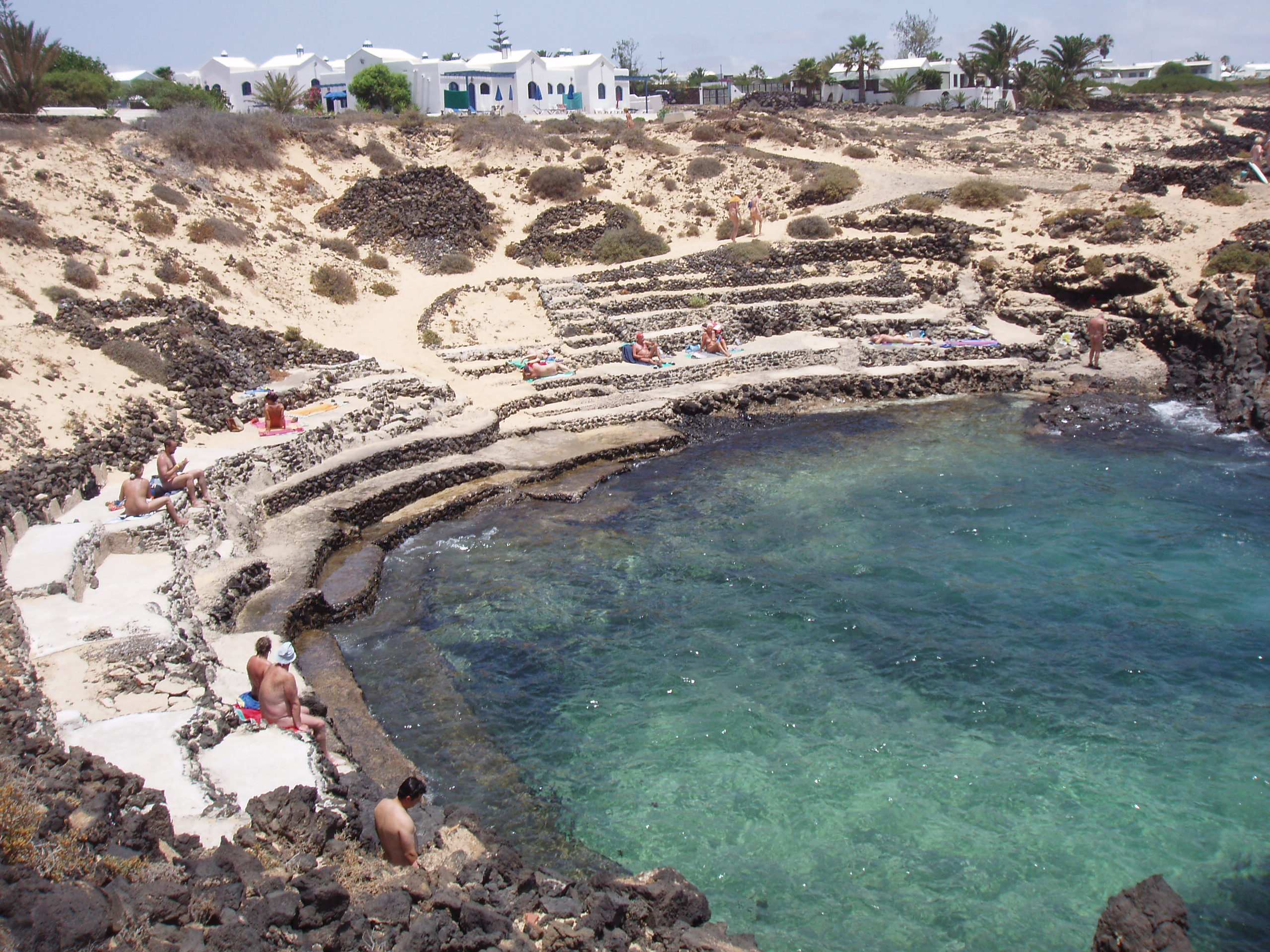

- Location within Lanzarote Location within Spain, Canary Islands
- Coordinates: 29°05′N 13°27′W
- Country: Spain
- Autonomous community: Canary Islands
- Island: Lanzarote
- Founder: Gregor Kaiser

Population (2013)
  - Total: 156

Charco del Palo is a naturist holiday village on the north-eastern coast of Lanzarote, in the Canary Islands. The village was established around 1970 by the German entrepreneur Gregor Kaiser. In due course, it has developed into a popular naturist resort. It was the first official naturist resort established in the Canaries: nudity is permitted everywhere in the village, and practised universally. Its isolated location, at the end of a dedicated three kilometer long access road, helps to achieve privacy, while the village remains open to all. Visitors are mainly German, British, and Dutch. The village's population increased from 82 in the year 2000 to 229 in 2011, it has subsequently declined to 156 in 2013.

The development was originally named Castillo de Papagayo, but since this causes confusion with the well-known Playa de Papagayo nude beach in the region of Playa Blanca in southern Lanzarote, the name Charco del Palo, which refers to a nearby prominent coastal pool now developed for bathing, has become standard.

Most of the bungalows and apartments are private property; many are being rented out when their owners are not using them. The German nudist travel organization Oböna owns an apartment complex here as well. The village has a few restaurants (Lily's Bar, Jardin Tropical, and Cueva Paloma) and a small supermarket. The terraces of Lily's Bar, Jardin Tropical and Cueva Paloma do allow (and frequently see) naked use.

The village is built on pale sandy soil, but the coast is rocky, with no beaches. However, three sheltered coves have been developed for safe bathing.

Charco del Palo is located near the villages of Mala and Guatiza, both about 3 kilometres (1.9 mi) away, which are served by a regular bus route between the island's capital Arrecife and the north of the island. The surrounding countryside is dominated by fields of prickly pear cactus (known locally as tunera), on which cochineal beetles are reared, and a few small extinct volcano cones.

The village lies mostly within the municipality of Haría, but the border with Teguise cuts through the southern part. All the public land in the area is owned by the original developer, who is responsible for providing public services. However, in recent times, residents have been complaining about neglect of public services such as sewerage, paving, and public lighting, and have been campaigning for the municipalities to assume responsibility for maintenance.

== Notes and references ==
- Kraeling, Werner, ed. (2009). Charco del Palo: Das Bilderbuch. Castillo del Papagayo SL.
- Andrews, Sarah; Quintero, Josephine (2007). Canary Islands. Lonely Planet. ISBN 978-1-74104-595-6.
- Corne, Lucy (2004). Canary Islands. Bradt Travel Guides. ISBN 978-1-84162-108-1.
- Reisenegger, Verónica (2006). ANWB Extra - Lanzarote (in Dutch). ANWB Media - Boeken & Gidsen. ISBN 978-90-18-01992-1.
