= Haría (village) =

- Town
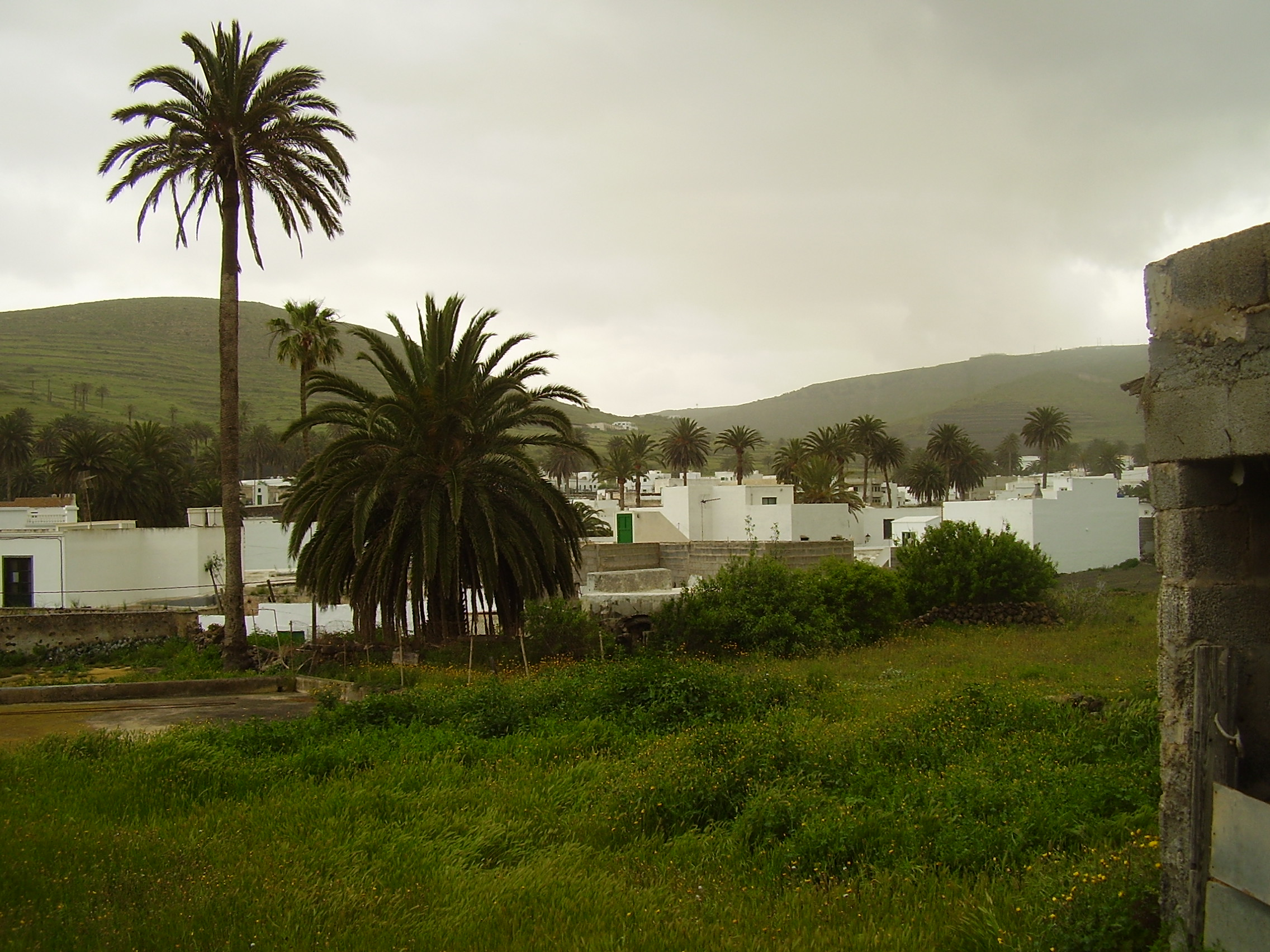

- Location in the Canary Islands
- Coordinates: 29°8′48″N 13°29′54″W
- Country: Spain
- Autonomous Community: Canary Islands
- Province: Las Palmas
- Island: Lanzarote
- Municipality: Haría

Population (2011)
  - Total: 1,128
- Time zone: UTC+0 (CET)
  - Summer (DST): UTC+1 (CEST (GMT +1))
- Postal code: 35520
- Area code: +34 (Spain) + 928 (Las Palmas)

Haría is a village in the municipality of Haría in the north of the island of Lanzarote in the Canary Islands. The town had a population of 1,128 in the 2011 census. The town is the capital of the municipality of Haría.

It lies in a valley known as the Valley of 1,000 Palms. A craft market is held in the town on Saturdays.

The artist César Manrique is buried in the cemetery of Haría.
