= Playas del Coco =

Beach community in Costa Rica

Coordinates: 10°33′5.15″N 85°41′52.96″W

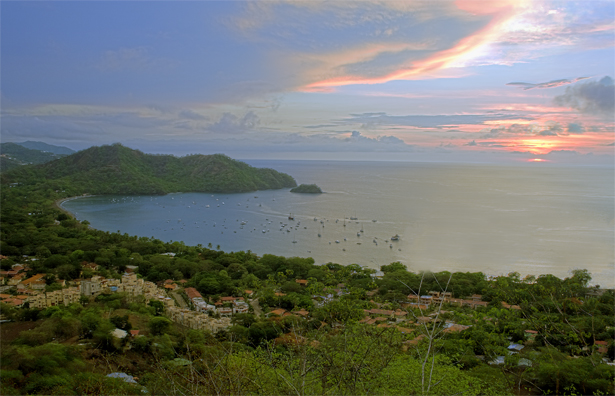
Playas del Coco

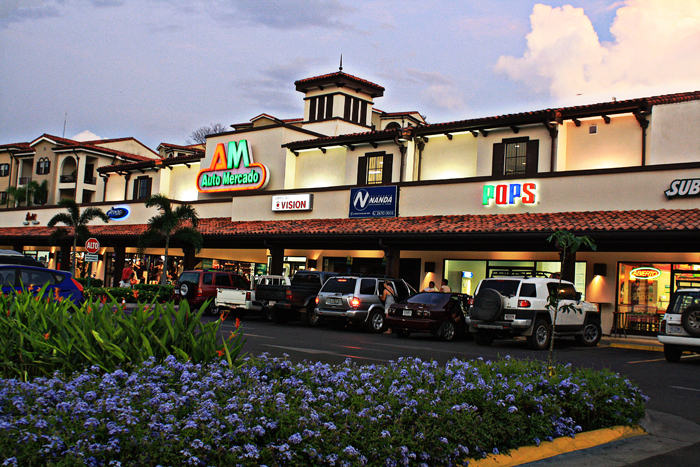
Supermarket plaza in the small beach town of Playas del Coco, Guanacaste.

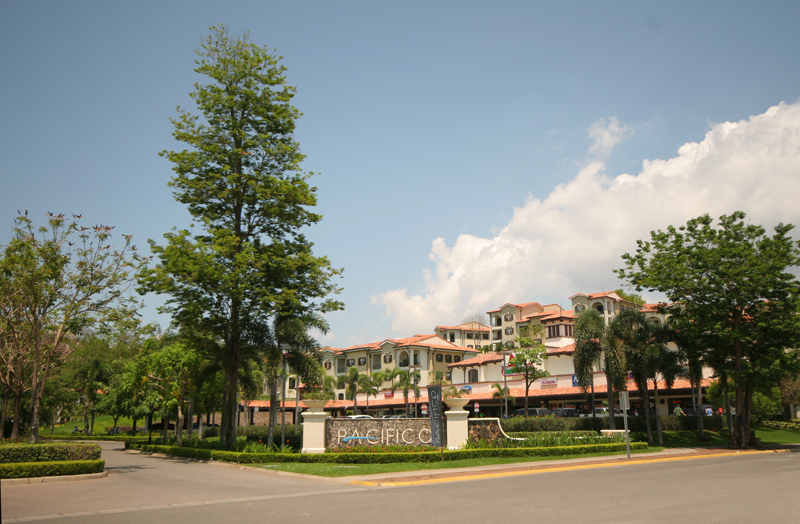
Plaza at the entrance of the small beach town of Playas del Coco, Guanacaste, Costa Rica.

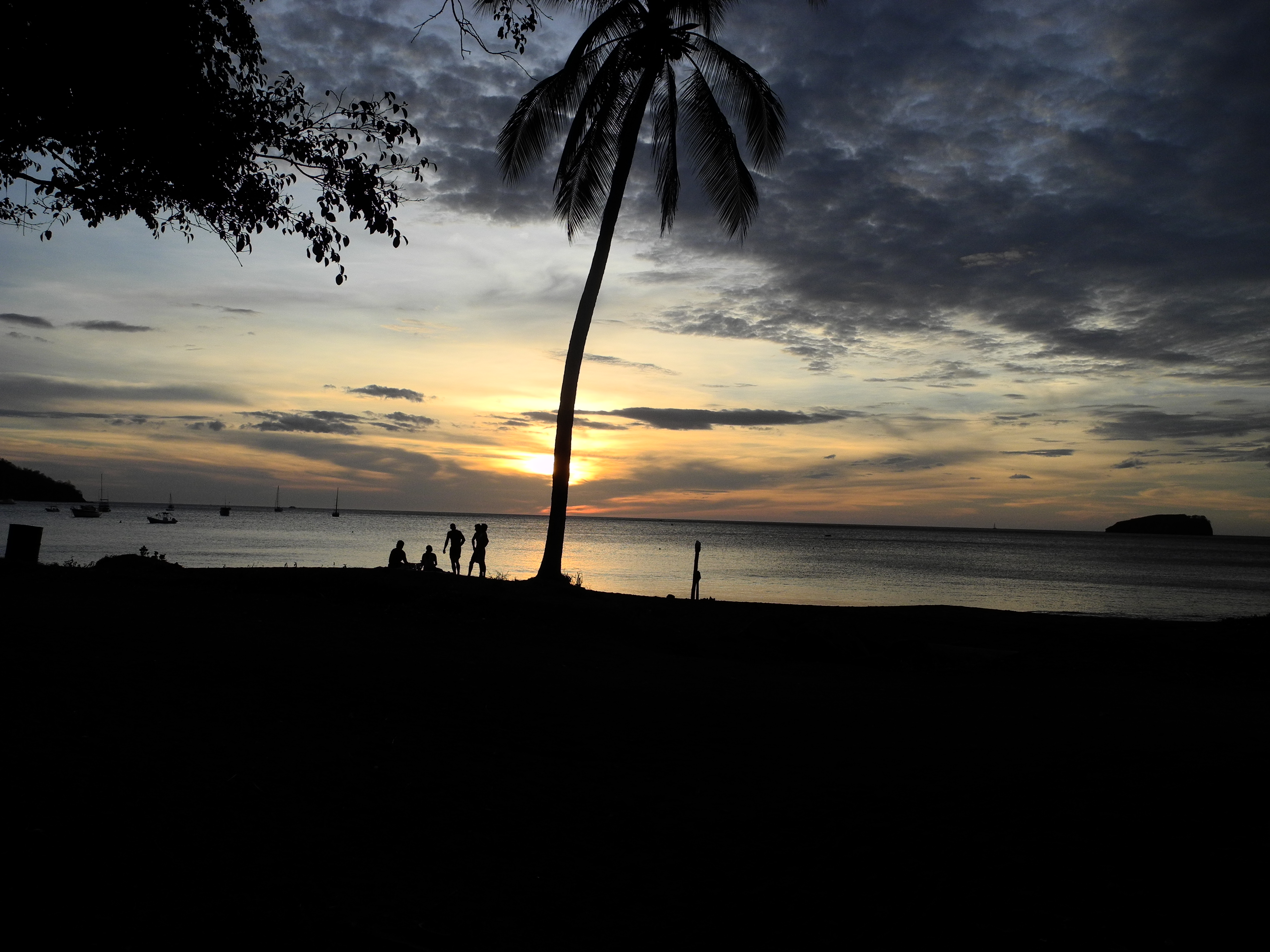
Sunset at Playas del Coco in 2010.

Playas del Coco is a beach community in Guanacaste Province, Costa Rica.

Playas del Coco is located approximately 20 miles (32 kilometers) from the city of Liberia, Costa Rica, the largest city in the province of Guanacaste and also its capital. The town experienced rapid growth due to the increasing number of international visitors and foreign-born residents, who arrived in the 1990s.
