= Haría (municipality) =

- Municipality
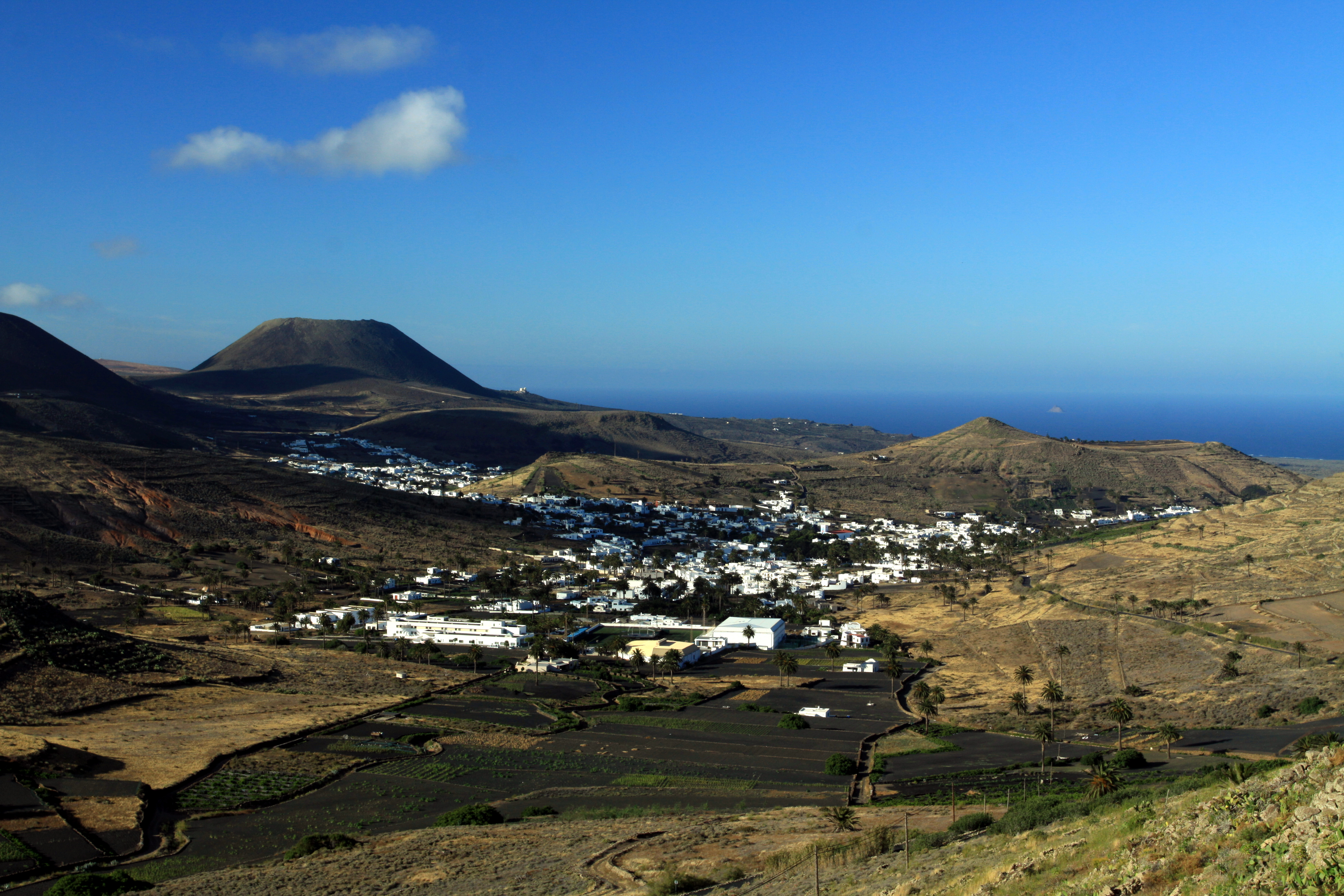
- View of Haría

- Flag Coat of arms

- Municipal location in Lanzarote

- Location in the province of Las Palmas Haría (Canary Islands) Haría (Spain, Canary Islands)
- Coordinates: 29°9′N 13°30′W
- Country: Spain
- Autonomous community: Canary Islands
- Province: Las Palmas
- Island: Lanzarote

Area
  - Total: 106.59 km^{2} (41.15 sq mi)

Population (2025-01-01)
  - Total: 5,623
  - Density: 52.75/km^{2} (136.6/sq mi)

Haría is a municipality on the island of Lanzarote in the Canary Islands, the northernmost and easternmost Canarian municipality. Surrounded on three sides by the Atlantic Ocean, the municipality is bordered to the south by the municipality of Teguise. It forms part of Las Palmas Province. The seat of the municipality is the town of Haría. The population of the municipality was 4,872 in 2013. The total land area of the municipality is 106.59 square kilometres (41.15 sq mi).

== Geography ==
The west of the municipality is largely mountainous, with much of the western coastline rising steeply a little way inland. Numerous miradors (viewpoints) on this high ground offer views of the island, with the most well known being the Mirador del Río which is a popular tourist attraction. To the southeast the land is low-lying and largely used for agriculture, with many small beach resorts along the coast. The northeast of the municipality is largely uninhabited, having been buried approximately 3000 years ago by the eruption of the Montaña Corona which formed the inhospitable Malpais de la Corona. This eruption also produced extensive hollow lava tunnels called jameos, some of which have been developed into two of the island's most-visited geological attractions: the Cueva de los Verdes and the Jameos del Agua.

== Communities ==
- Arrieta
- Casa La Breña
- Casas Las Escarnas
- Charco del Palo
- Guinate
- Haría
- Los Molinos
- Mágues
- Mala
- Órzola
- Punta Mujeres
- Tabayesco
- Ye

== Sites of interest ==
- Mirador del Río
- Jameos del Agua
- Cueva de los Verdes
- Montaña Corona
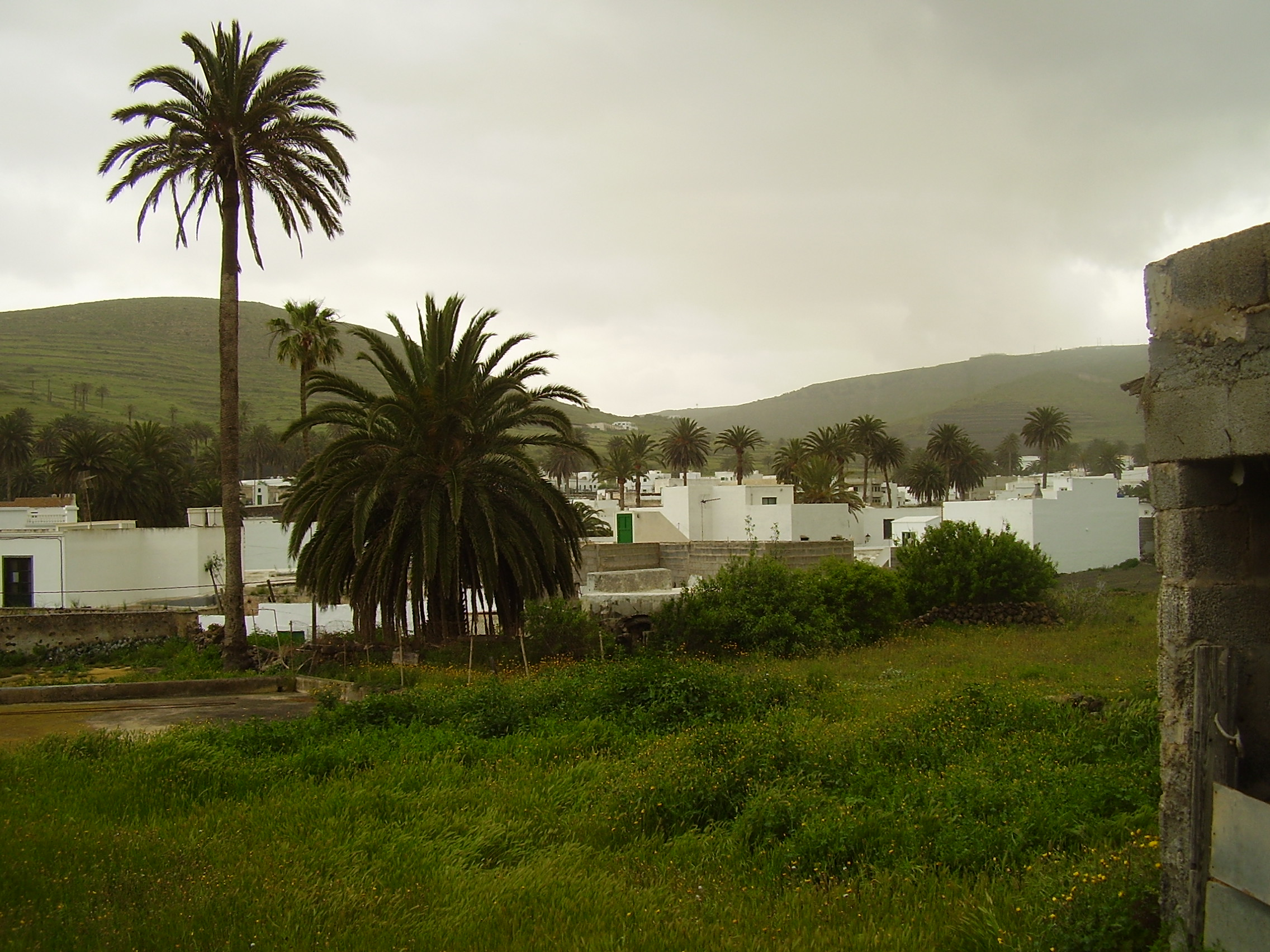
Haría, Lanzarote

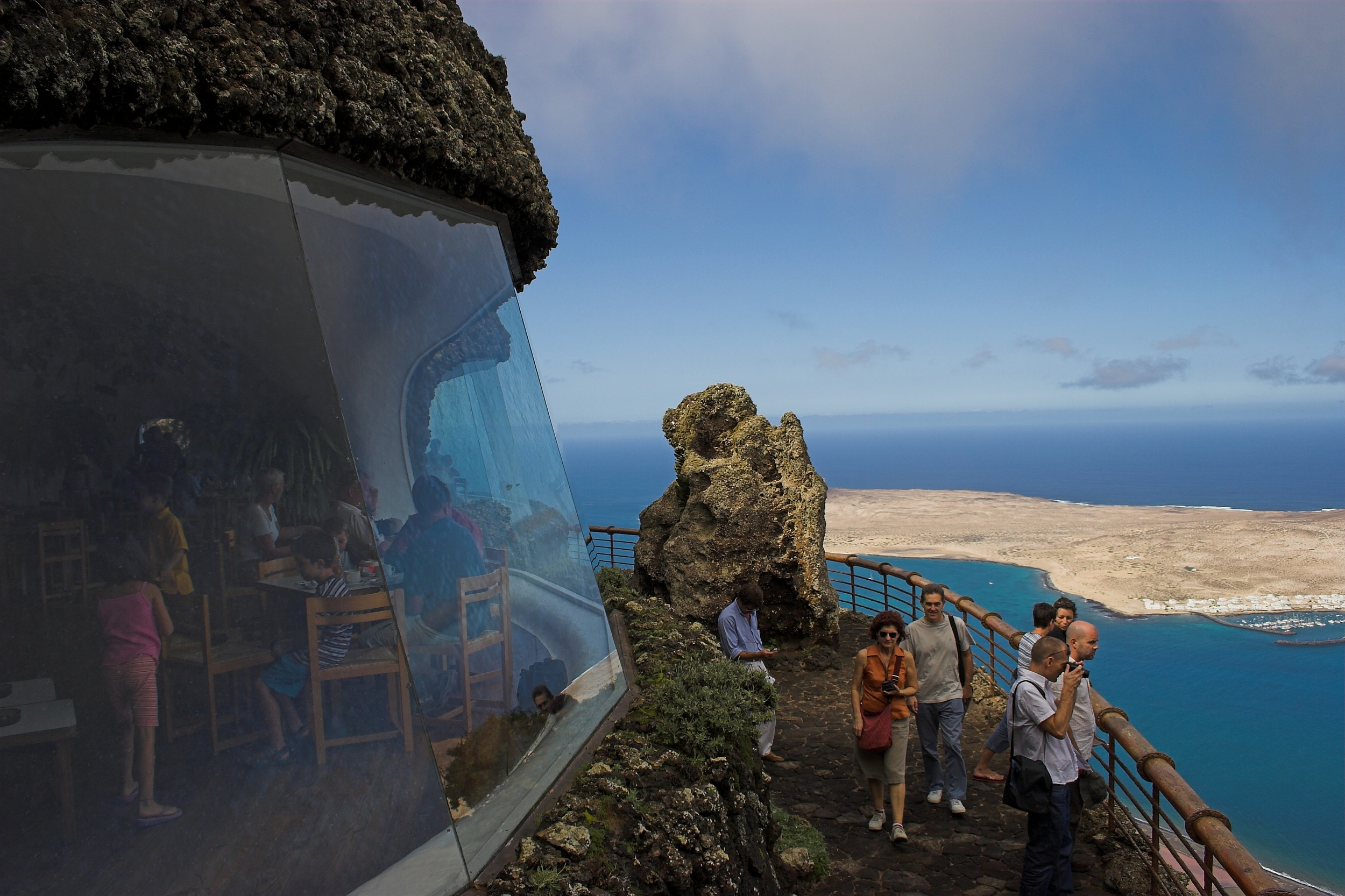
Mirador del Río

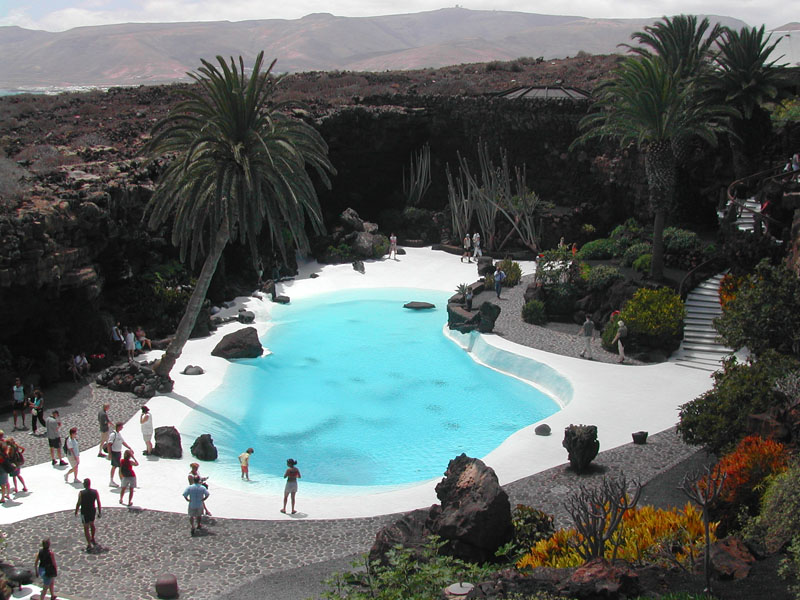
Pool at cave system Jameos del Agua, Lanzarote

== See also ==
- List of municipalities in Las Palmas
