= Papagayo (software) =

Lip-syncing software

- Papagayo during lip syncing
- Developer: e frontier
- Stable release: 2.0
- Operating system: Microsoft Windows, Mac OS X, Linux
- Type: animation
- License: GNU General Public License
- Website: Papagayo homepage User forum

Papagayo is a free Lip-syncing software made in Python for Microsoft Windows, Mac OS X and Linux. It works by importing an audio file, as well as writing the text for the audio and placing it accordingly. The program then uses a built-in dictionary to select the appropriate mouth for the spoken text. Modifications and dictionaries are available on the forum.

Originally created as a tool for LostMarble's own Moho editor, the tool is being adopted by users and developers of several open source animation products (including Blender and Synfig Studio) to add lip-sync features not available in the base software package.
