= Papagayo Jet =

Meteorological phenomenon in Central America

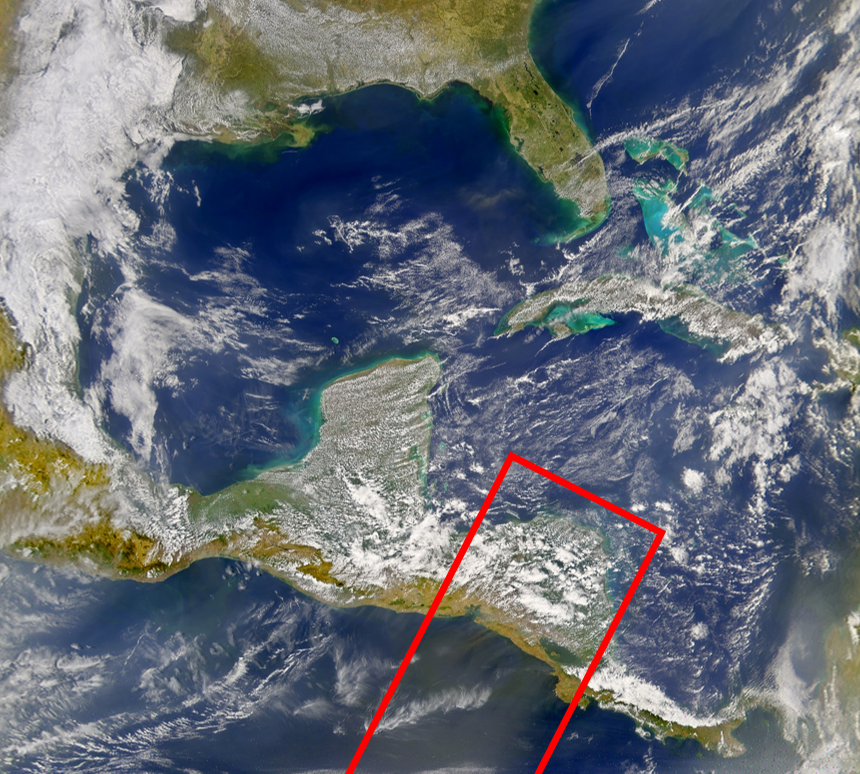
This satellite image, taken by the Sea-viewing Wide-field-of-view Sensor (SeaWiFS), shows dust being carried across Nicaragua and Costa Rica by the Papagayo Winds.

The Papagayo Jet, also referred to as the Papagayo Wind or the Papagayo Wind Jet, is strong intermittent winds that blow approximately 70 km north of the Gulf of Papagayo, after which they are named. The jet winds travel southwest from the Caribbean and the Gulf of Mexico to the Pacific Ocean through a pass in the Cordillera mountains at Lake Nicaragua. The jet follows the same path as the northeast trade winds in this region; however, due to a unique combination of synoptic scale meteorology and orographic phenomena, the jet winds can reach much greater speeds than their trade wind counterparts. That is to say, the winds occur when cold high-pressure systems from the North American continent meet warm moist air over the Caribbean and Gulf of Mexico, generating winds that are then funneled through a mountain pass in the Cordillera. The Papagayo Jet is also not unique to this region. There are two other breaks in the Cordillera where this same phenomenon occurs, one at the Chivela Pass in Mexico and another at the Panama Canal, producing the Tehuano (Tehuantepecer) and the Panama jets respectively.

The Papagayo Jet also induces mesoscale meteorology phenomena that influence the pacific waters hundreds of kilometers off the Nicaraguan and Costa Rican shores. When the jet wind surges, it creates cyclonic and anticyclonic eddies, Ekman transport, and upwelling that contribute to the creation of the Costa Rica Dome off the western coast of Central America in the Western Hemisphere Warm Pool (WHWP). The relatively cold, nutrient-rich waters of the dome, in comparison to the surrounding WHWP, create an ideal habitat for a number of species making the Papagayo Wind Jet important for biodiversity in the Eastern Tropical Pacific.

== Formation ==
In North and Central America, during the Northern Hemisphere winter, high-pressure systems are created between the equator and 35th parallels north via atmospheric circulation. Air near the equator is warmed by the sun. This heated air is more buoyant than colder air so it rises and is then pushed poleward by more air rising from below. Once the air reaches northern latitudes it begins to cool and as a result it falls back towards to the Earth's surface. As the air is falling it exerts more pressure downward on the surface, creating a high-pressure system. This cold, high-pressure air mass then travels equatorward. Air masses repeatedly move in this loop, but due to the Coriolis force, this convection is not perfectly aligned south to north. In actuality, the air moves clockwise in the Northern Hemisphere, as it moves from the equator to higher latitudes and then back to the equator again.

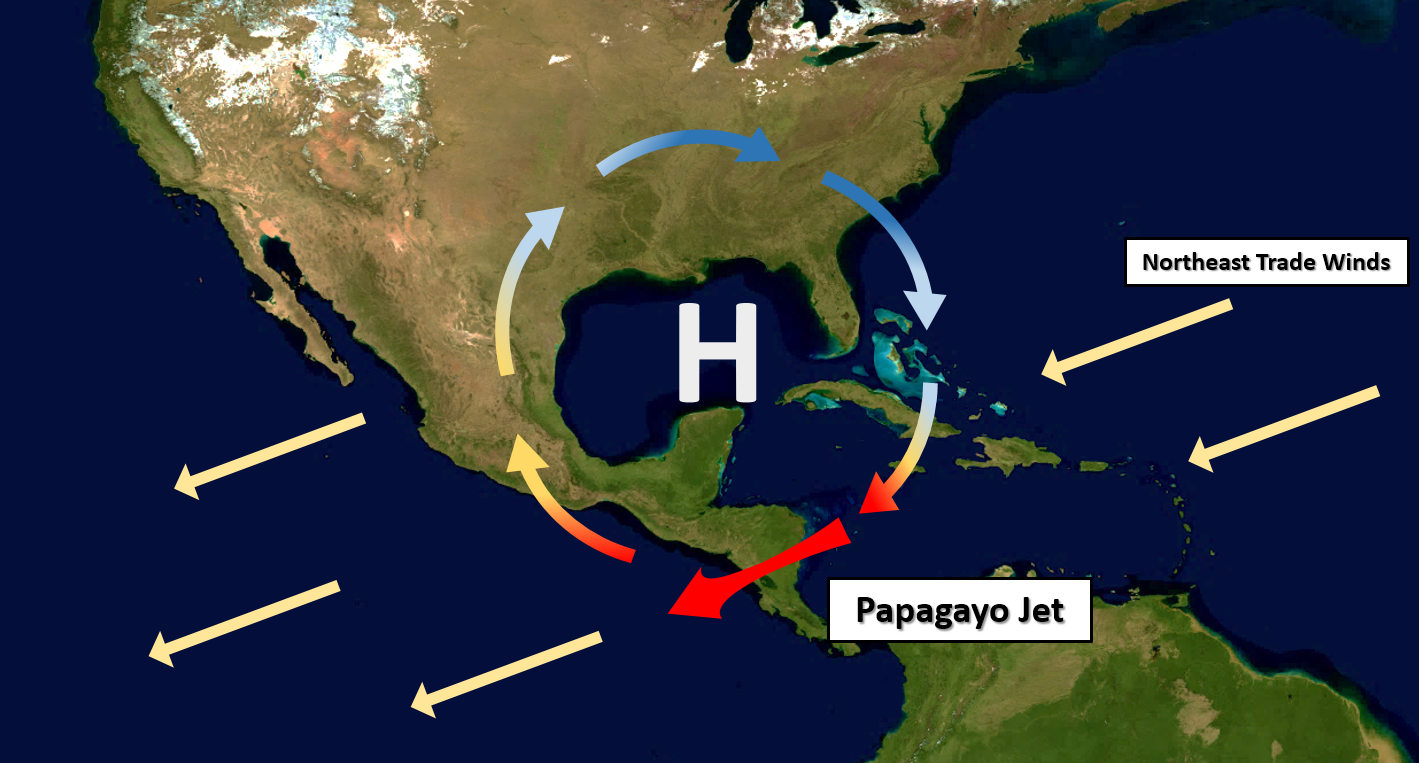
A NASA satellite image was annotated to demonstrate a cartoon high-pressure system that would influence the formation of the Papagayo Jet.

The air travelling clockwise off the North American continent is cold and dense, with a high pressure. As it moves southwest over the Caribbean and the Gulf of Mexico, it meets warm, moist air with a comparatively low pressure. This establishes a dramatic pressure gradient, causing the cold, high-pressure air to flow quickly into the low-pressure area. This is analogous to air flowing rapidly out of a balloon when the neck of the balloon is left open. The air in the balloon has a higher pressure than the surrounding air so the air flows out of the balloon until the pressure inside and outside of the balloon is equal.

If Central America were topographically flat, the air would flow uninterrupted from the Caribbean to the Pacific Ocean; however, the Cordillera mountains, which run along the west coast of Central America, block this flow. As a result, the air is funneled into a narrow mountain pass near Lake Nicaragua and the Gulf of Papagayo, creating the Papagayo Jet. Again, the balloon example serves as an analogy of how the Papagayo Jet forms; the air moving out of the balloon cannot escape all at once because there is only a small opening that allows for the release of air. The narrow opening of the balloon facilitates the creation of a wind because the air velocity increases through the balloon neck. Like the wind blowing through the balloon neck, the Papagayo winds reach high speeds as they travel through the break in the Cordillera. For context, Papagayo jet winds have mean speeds of 20 meters per second (72 km/h; 45 mph) and can reach speeds of up to 30 meters per second (110 km/h; 67 mph), in comparison with average trade wind speeds of 25 km/h. Once the Papagayo Jet winds reach the Pacific Ocean they slow considerably and merge with the trade winds. Papagayo wind jet surges can occur intermittently every few weeks and last several days during the Northern Hemisphere winter.

The jet is most prominent in the winter months because the pressure gradient is largest between the two air masses during this time of the year. The greater the difference in temperature between the two air masses, the faster the air will flow from an area of high pressure into an area of low pressure. In the spring, summer, and fall months the air mass from the North American continent is much warmer so the resultant air flow is less dramatic and the wind speeds are not as high. In sum, wind speeds in the Papagayo Jet will be high through the months of November to March, peaking in February, then they will be reduced from April to August, and finally diminish completely in September.

== Influence on the Costa Rica Dome ==
The Papagayo Jet winds are strong enough to influence the ocean waters off the west coast of Central America, namely being one of the factors responsible for the Costa Rica Dome. The Costa Rica Dome is a roughly circular area of anomalously cold water in the eastern tropical Pacific. It has a diameter of approximately 300-500 kilometers and is centered approximately 300 kilometers west of the Gulf of Papagayo. The waters surrounding the dome (known as the Western Hemisphere Warm Pool) are considerably warmer due to heating from the sun, given the region's proximity to the equator. The existence of the Costa Rica Dome can be attributed to a multitude of mesoscale oceanic effects; however, the Papagayo Jet plays a considerable role in the size, movement, and continued existence of the dome throughout the year.

As the Papagayo winds blow during the winter months they cool the surface ocean water in their path causing the extension of the Costa Rica Dome east (from 300 to approximately 1000 kilometers in diameter) to the Nicaraguan and Costa Rican coastlines. The mechanism for this cooling is explained by the influence of the Papagayo winds on the ocean surface currents. As the winds blow southwest over the Pacific they create cyclonic and anticyclonic coastal eddies on the water surface due to Ekman pumping. These coastal eddies generate the upwelling of cold water from greater ocean depths where the rising cold water then mixes with the warmer water near the surface and subsequently lowers sea surface temperatures. Therefore, the Papagayo Jet indirectly cools the coastal waters off the shores of Nicaragua and Costa Rica, extending the Costa Rica Dome. During the winter months, the coastal eddies and by extension the Papagayo Jet, are thought to be the primary drivers of the dome. Model simulations indicate that without the Papagayo Jet the Costa Rica Dome would not grow to such a large extent and may not even persist year-round.

== Impact on regional biodiversity ==
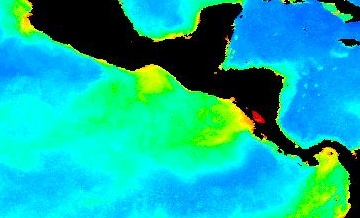
Chlorophyll growth extending off the coast of Lake Nicaragua due to nutrient upwelling by January 2001 Papagayo Jet

The Papagayo Jet is an important meteorological phenomenon when considering ocean biodiversity in the eastern tropical Pacific. The jet plays a key role in lowering sea surface temperatures, through the influence on the Costa Rica Dome. The movement and growth of the dome is caused by the seasonal variability of the jet where the annual upwelling and mixing caused by the Papagayo Jet during dome extension allows for the transport of nutrient-rich cold waters to the surface. If the jet was a permanent feature (and by extension, the dome was also permanent) there would be no seasonal transport of nutrients via cold water upwelling. Indirect evidence of this nutrient transport can be seen in satellite imagery showing increased chlorophyll production in the surface waters directly under the path of the jet. The dome has also shown to be an area with increased zooplankton biomass as well as an area inhabited by blue whales who seem to follow the dome as it migrates in the eastern tropical Pacific waters.

== See also ==
- Hadley Cell
