= Papagayo Peninsula =

Peninsula on the north Pacific coast of Costa Rica

Coordinates: 10.6167°N 85.6820°W

- Interactive map of Papagayo Peninsula

Geography
- Location: Guanacaste Province, Costa Rica

Administration
- Costa Rica

Papagayo Peninsula is located on the north Pacific coast of Costa Rica in the northwest province of Guanacaste. It is located in the Golfo de Papagayo and was formed by volcanic activity as the Caribbean tectonic plate continuously overrode the Cocos Plate and by subsequent weather erosion. The 15 miles (24 km) at the coastline contains 31 separate beaches. The larger Elena Peninsula Santa to the north protects the waters in the Papagayo Peninsula.

Papagayo Peninsula is a popular tourist destination, home to the Four Seasons Resort Costa Rica, which includes an Arnold Palmer Signature Course. The peninsula also includes a small selection of luxury homes and properties with multiple new projects that are being developed in the area. Per government mandate, 70% of the land in the Papagayo Peninsula must remain natural ensuring that the beauty of the land is not lost by overdevelopment.

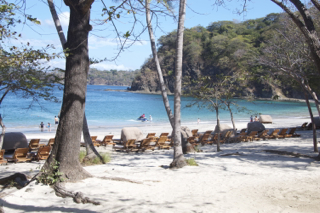
A view of the beach from the Four Seasons in Papagayo

== Resorts and Hotels ==
Papagayo Peninsula is becoming an increasingly popular tourist destination. As of 2018, the peninsula is home to 3 resorts: the Four Seasons Costa Rica, the Andaz Peninsula Papagayo Resort, and Nekajui Peninsula Papagayo, a Ritz-Carlton Reserve. The Four Seasons Resort has been received numerous awards specifically from Travel + Leisure, such as the 500 World’s Best Hotels in 2009, the World's 3 Best Service 2012 and 2013 until 2022, 25th on the World's Number One Family Beach Resorts in 2016 and the number one resort in Latin America.

== Permanent Residence ==
The first luxury resort and development venture in Central America to be ecologically friendly is called Peninsula Papagayo. As a group of estate mansions, it is situated among the peninsula's hills. Custom private estates, home sites with ocean views and ocean-fronts, as well as opulent condominiums and villas are among the residential options offered in the Peninsula Papagayo real estate's first phase. Private estates and villas are available in their own region at the Four Seasons Resort. Each private estate owner has access to the Four Seasons Resort's amenities, including housekeeping, room service, use of the Arnold Palmer Golf Course, the hotel spa, and access to the pool and fitness center. Additionally, there are condos in the neighborhood named Las Terrazas that look out over the fairways of the Arnold Palmer Golf Course and the Bahia de Culebra. The Playa Prieta beachfront estates, the sole beachfront property choice along the peninsula's 15 miles of coastline, are another alternative for a home. Contact information for the Four Seasons Costa Rica office handling real estate sales can be found on the Peninsula Papagayo website.

== Peninsula Papagayo Marina ==
The Papagayo Marina is an ongoing project designed and developed by a firm from Sarasota, Florida. The project is part of a long-term tourism project to enhance opportunities for visitors and residence of Peninsula Papagayo. The marina basin is located on the southwest side of the peninsula and is next to the Four Seasons Resort. The company responsible for the project is Brandy Marine, Inc. They have also developed various marinas in the United States, Mexico and the Dominican Republic. The marina project is being developed in order to attract sport fishing yachts and motor cruisers migrating along the coast of the Pacific Ocean. Phase I of the Marina Papagayo was opened to boaters on January 13, 2009. Phase I includes 180 boat slips capable of supporting private boats ranging anywhere from sport fishing boats to mega-yachts. The project site rests on 2,300 acres (9.3 km^{2}) of Costa Rican land. Marina Papagayo, with its sheltered and peaceful location serves as both a strategic harbor and pleasure stop for boaters. Once finished the marina should be able to hold up to 450 boats at a time.

== Activities ==
Since much of Papagayo Peninsula remains undeveloped, there are multiple outdoor activities available. Outdoor activities include deep-sea fishing, boat cruising, snorkeling, scuba diving, surfing, windsurfing, sea kayaking, white-water rafting, forest canopy tours, horseback riding. Also close by is hiking in Costa Rican National Parks and visit local villages and historic sites in the surrounding areas. Golf is one of the most popular activities at the peninsula. The peninsula also includes a tennis center managed by PBI Tennis Specialists. A new development is the Village at the Marina Papagayo. Which will include shops, restaurants, and entertainment bars. The Marina will also include additional hotels, more residential opportunities, boutique shops and local artisans. Builders of the Village at Marina Papagayo are designing the village to have an ambiance similar to Portofino, Italy, with global sophistication and sunrise to sunset festivities.

=== Nearby sites ===
Nearby sites of interest include: Parque Nacional Santa Rosa, Parque Nacional Rincon de la Vieja, Guanacaste National Park, Lomas de Barbudal Biological Reserve, Tenorio Volcano National Park, and Palo Verde National Park.

=== Golf courses ===
Papagayo Peninsula contains a private 18-hole signature designed Arnold Palmer golf course. 6,788 yards wind their way through 125 acres (0.51 km^{2}) to make up the golf course. The course has dramatic changes of elevation and views of the Pacific Ocean from 14 of its 18 holes. Golf Digest ranked this golf course as #53 in the world outside the US in 2010 making it the #3 ranked golf course in all of Latin America.
