= LZ-2 road (Spain) =

Road on Lanzarote Island, Spain

LZ-2

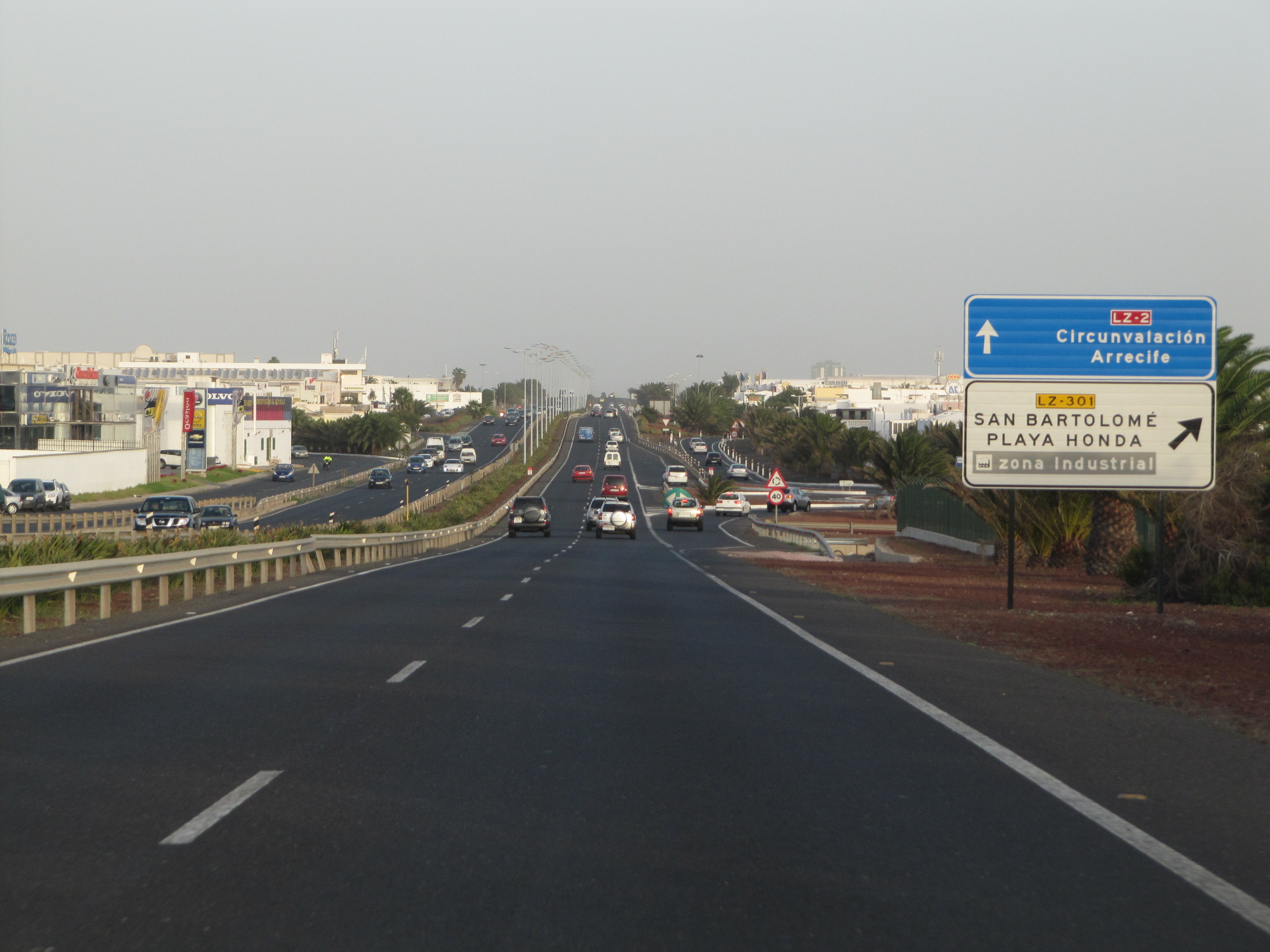
- LZ-2 near Lanzarote Airport

Route information
- Maintained by Government of the Canary Islands
- Length: 37.4 km (23.2 mi)

Major junctions
- From: Arrecife
- To: Playa Blanca

Location
- Country: Spain
- Autonomous community: Canary Islands
- Province: Las Palmas
- Towns: Arrecife, Playa Honda, Tías, Mácher, Uga, Yaiza and Playa Blanca

Highway system
- Highways in Spain; Autopistas and autovías; National Roads; Transport in the Canary Islands

LZ-2 is one of the main roads on the island of Lanzarote in the Canary Islands. It leads south from the island's capital, Arrecife, ending at the island's southernmost town of Playa Blanca. From here, ferries are available to cross the strait of La Bocayna, effectively connecting the LZ-2 to the FV-1 on the island of Fuerteventura. Lanzarote Airport is also accessed by the LZ-2.

Although most of the island's roads are owned by the island council (cabildo insular), roads of major importance such as the LZ-2 are owned by the Government of the Canary Islands.

The road is a dual carriageway, with two lanes in each direction, between Arrecife and Tías (approximately 11 kilometres (6.8 mi)); the rest of the route, between Tías and Playa Blanca (approximately 26 kilometres (16 mi)) is a single carriageway. As of July 2019, there are two fixed speed cameras on LZ-2, on kilometre 1.2 in both directions; the speed limit at this point is 100 kilometres per hour (62 mph).
