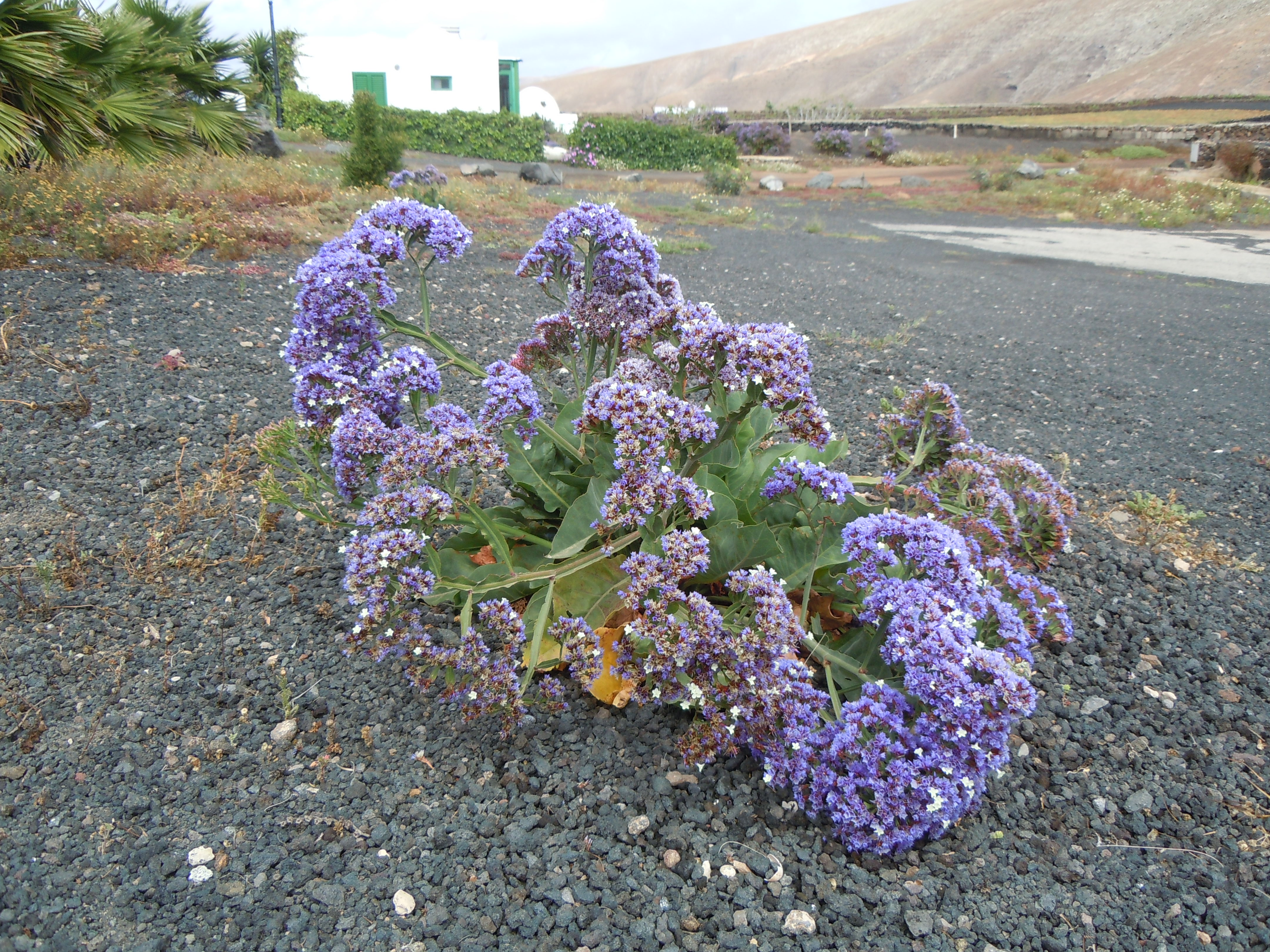
- In Yaiza, Lanzarote
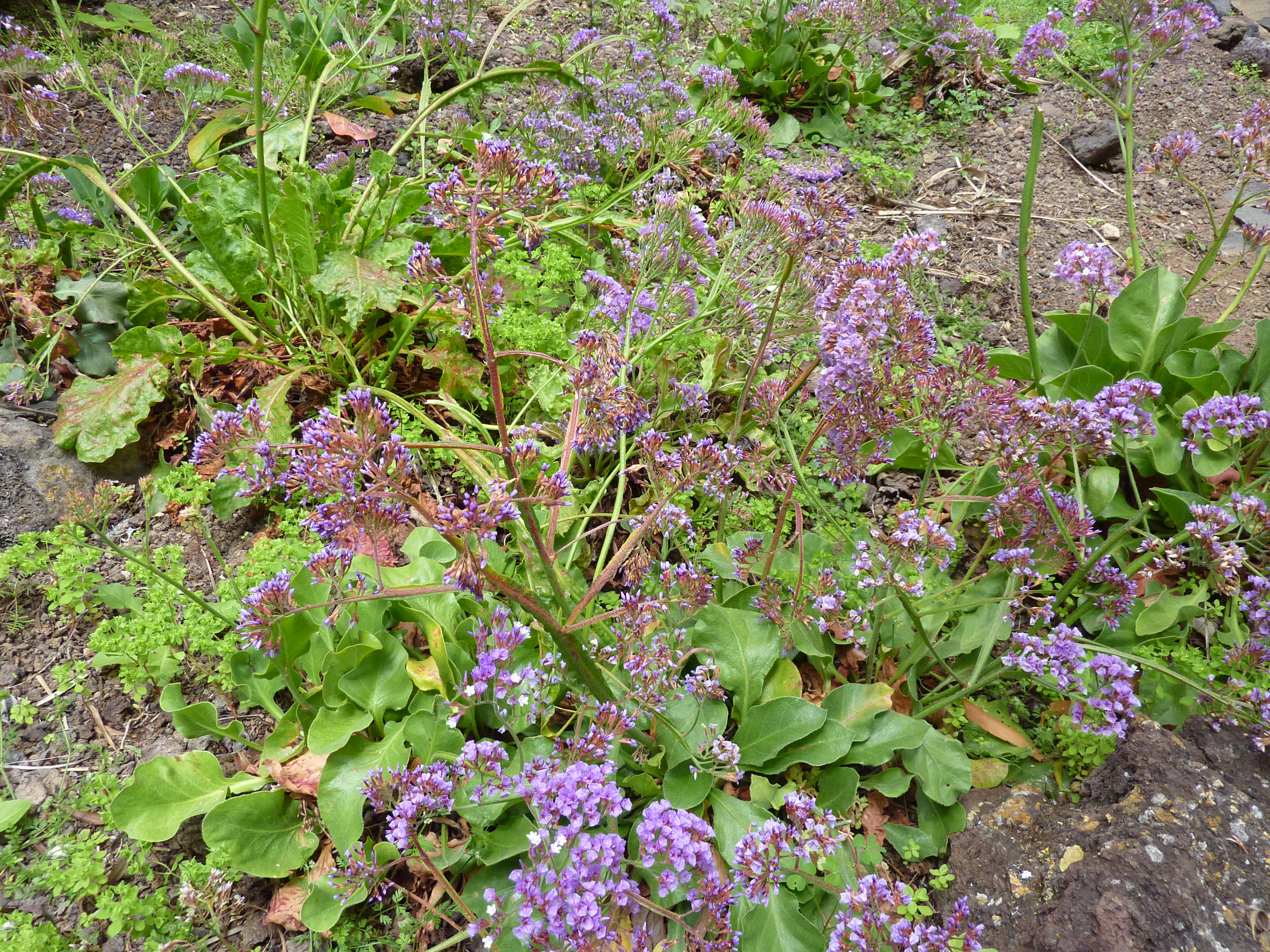
- At the Jardín Botánico Canario Viera y Clavijo

Scientific classification
- Kingdom: Plantae
- Clade: Embryophytes
- Clade: Tracheophytes
- Clade: Angiosperms
- Clade: Eudicots
- Order: Caryophyllales
- Family: Plumbaginaceae
- Genus: Limonium
- Species: L. bourgeaui

Binomial name
- Limonium bourgeaui (Webb ex Boiss.) Kuntze

Synonyms
- Statice bourgeaui Webb ex Boiss.

= Limonium bourgeaui =

Species of plant

Limonium bourgeaui is a species of flowering plant in the family Plumbaginaceae, native to Lanzarote and Fuerteventura in the Canary Islands. A herbaceous perennial and subshrub, it is morphologically similar to but genetically distinct from Limonium puberulum.
