= Macher =

Macher is a German surname. Notable people with the surname include:

- Heinz Macher (1919–2001), German SS and Nazi official
- Helena Macher (born 1937), Polish luger
- Stu Macher, killer in Scream

== See also ==
- Macher, a Yiddish word used in English, see Yiddish words used in English § M-- literally, "doer, someone who does things", big shot
- Mácher, a village in the Canary Islands, Spain
