= Uga (Lanzarote) =

Coordinates: 28°57′N 13°45′W

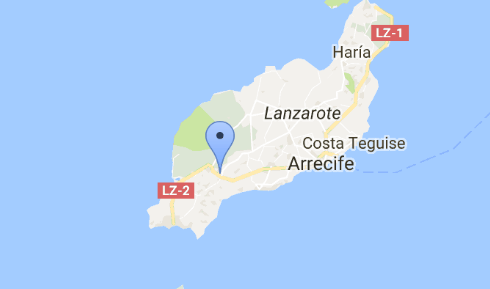
Uga on a map

Uga (pronounced ew-gah) is a small wine-producing village in Yaiza municipality in the province of Las Palmas, southern Lanzarote, off the coast of Africa. As of 2016 its population is 998, and nearby cities include Puerto del Carmen, Tías, and Playa Blanca. The closest airport is Lanzarote's official airport, also known as Arrecife airport.

The houses in Uga are small and white, with the largest building in the area being its church.

== Tourism ==
Hotels and restaurants are available in the village. Camel rides are offered through the lava fields to the Camel Park. Dromedaries are bred there, which take visitors from there to Timanfaya National Park and on safari tours in other areas of the island. Another tourist attraction in Uga is a set of three large camel sculptures recently created by Paco Curbelo.
