= LZ3 =

LZ3 may refer to

- LZ3 (Lanzarote), a road in the Canary Islands
- Led Zeppelin III, a record by Led Zeppelin
- Zeppelin LZ 3, an airship of the German Army
