= Mácher =

Coordinates: 28°57′N 13°41′W

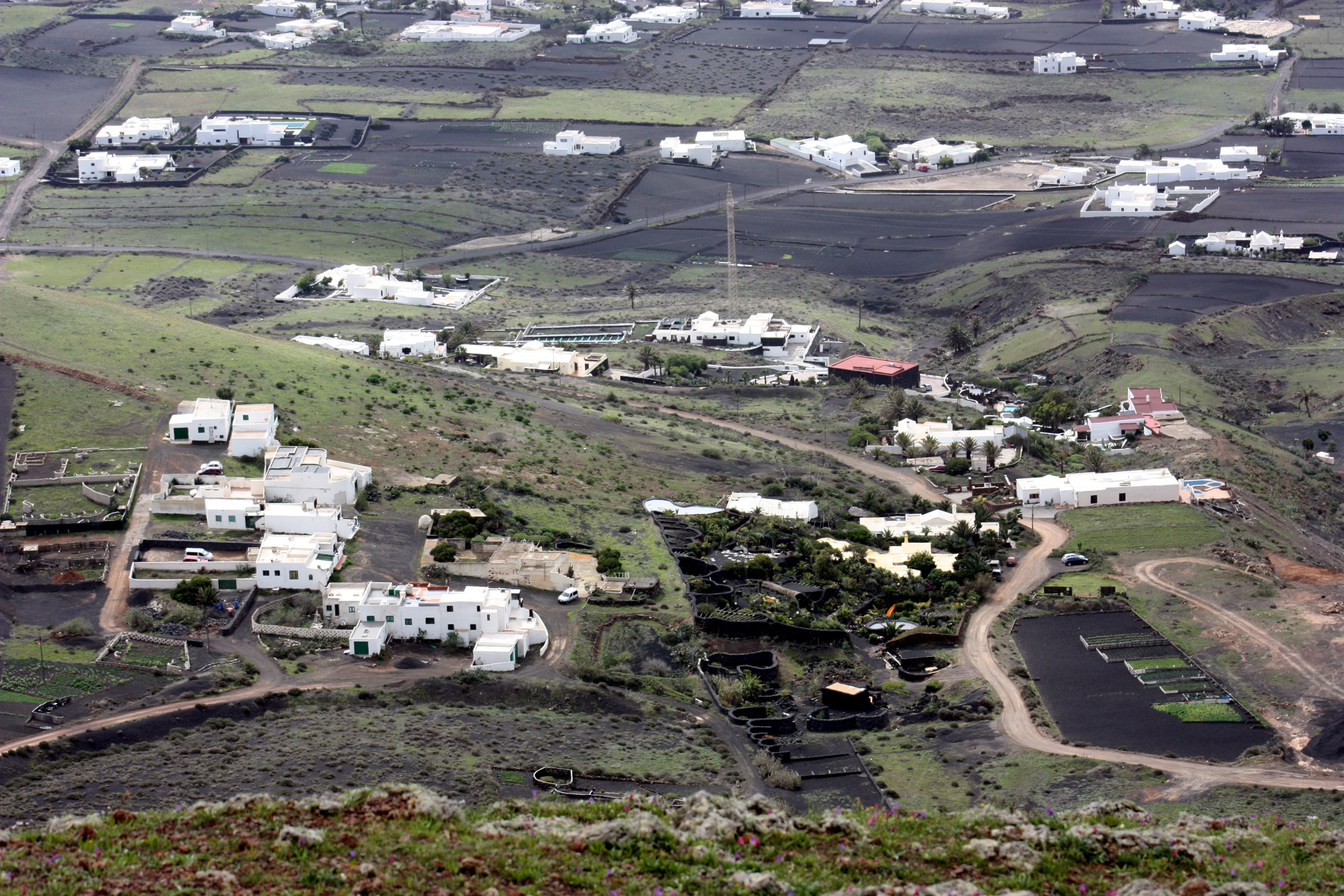

Mácher is a village on the Spanish island of Lanzarote, in the municipality of Tias.

== Demographics and location ==
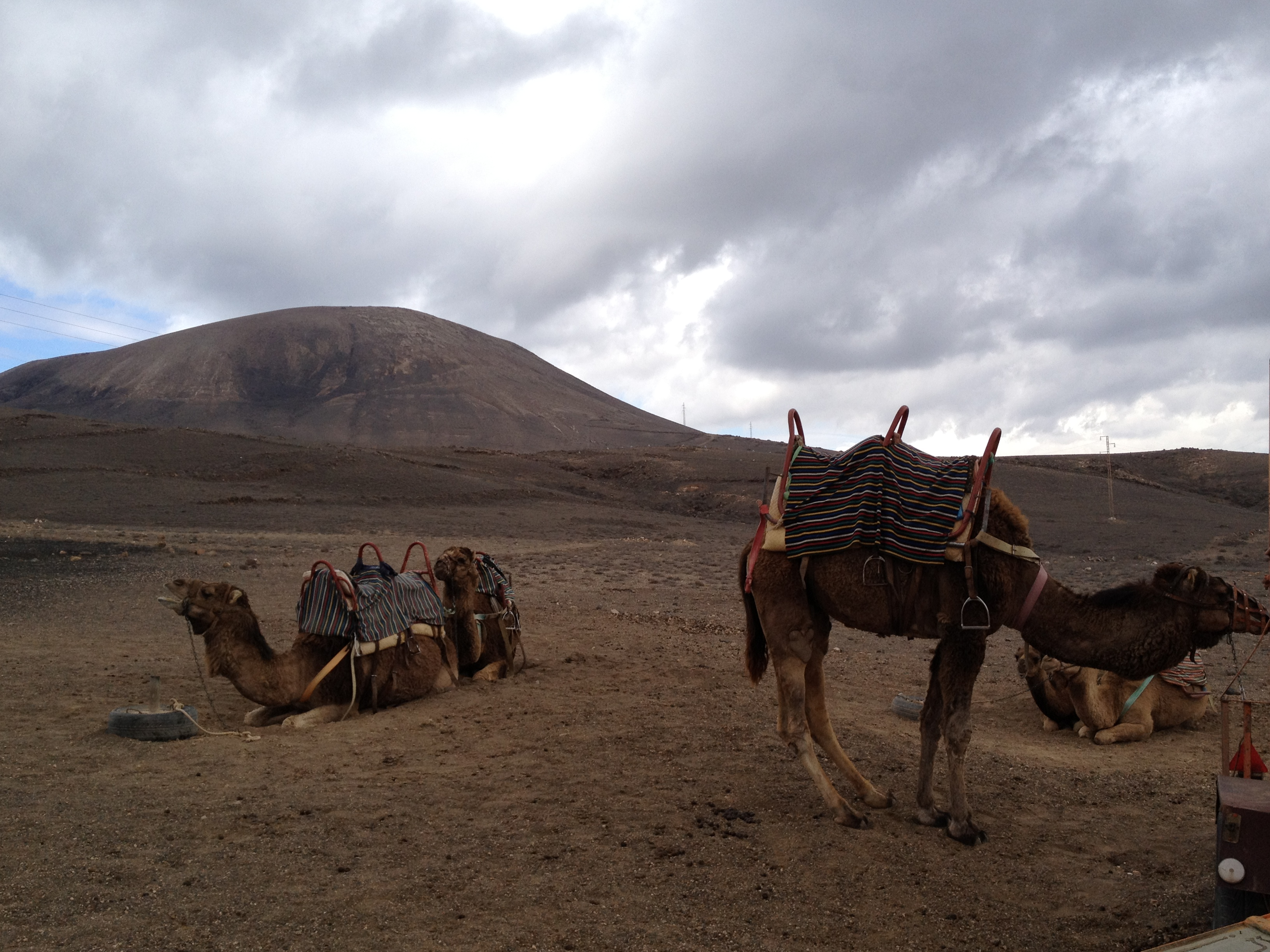
Cameling riding outside of Mácher

The village's population is 1,534 inhabitants in 2025. It is situated on the southern island of Lanzarote, about 14 kilometres (8.7 mi) from the capital Arrecife, and 9 kilometres (5.6 mi) from the airport. It is characterized by a dispersed settlement on both sides of Arrecife-Yaiza-Playa Blanca road. It is located very close to Puerto del Carmen, about 2 miles from Puerto Calero.

The area was characterized by the cultivation of tomatoes and onions. Onions are grown north of the road, and tomatoes are south. More recently, most of its inhabitants work in tourism and services.

Its name possibly derived from the Italian word "Maschera", drifted to Mácheres, and finally Macher.

== Points of interest ==
Among the most prominent attractions are houses of past centuries and the Molina de Macher. Among the natural attractions are the mountains of Guardilama (the third highest in Lanzarote) and Tinasoria mountain. The latter hosts paragliding and hang gliding, particularly the massif of Famara.

The town's patron is St. Peter, celebrated with an annual festival on June 29.
