= Port of Arrecife =

Main port for Lanzarote

Arrecife
- Click on the map for a fullscreen view
- Arrecife (Africa)

Location
- Country: Spain
- Location: Lanzarote
- Coordinates: 28°58′N 13°32′W
- UN/LOCODE: ESACE

Details
- Operated by: Autoridad Portuaria de Las Palmas
- Type of harbour: Coastal breakwater
- No. of piers: 6
- Draft depth: Depth 15.0 metres (49.2 ft)

Statistics
- Website www.palmasport.es/en/port-of-arrecife/

The Port of Arrecife is the main port facility for Lanzarote and the second busiest in the Canary Islands in terms of passengers. It handles passenger ferries, cruise ships and ro-ro cargo, but also bulk, breakbulk, containers, liquid bulk, and has a large fishing port.

== Cruise port ==
Arrecife is a major cruise port with over 400,000 cruise passenger visits per annum. Most cruise ships now dock at the La Boca de Puerto Naos, which is closer to the city than the berths at the commercial port.
