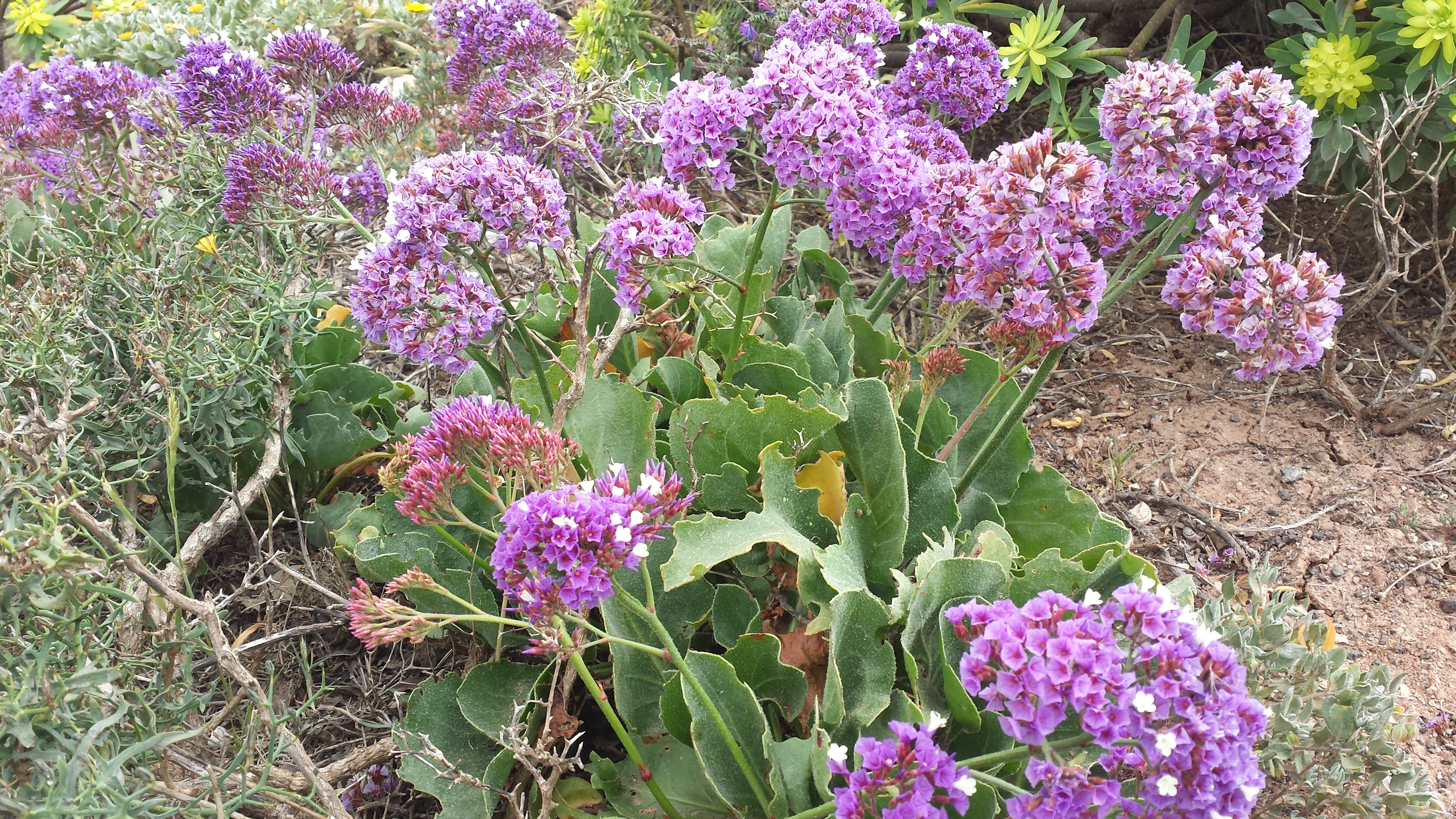
- Habit
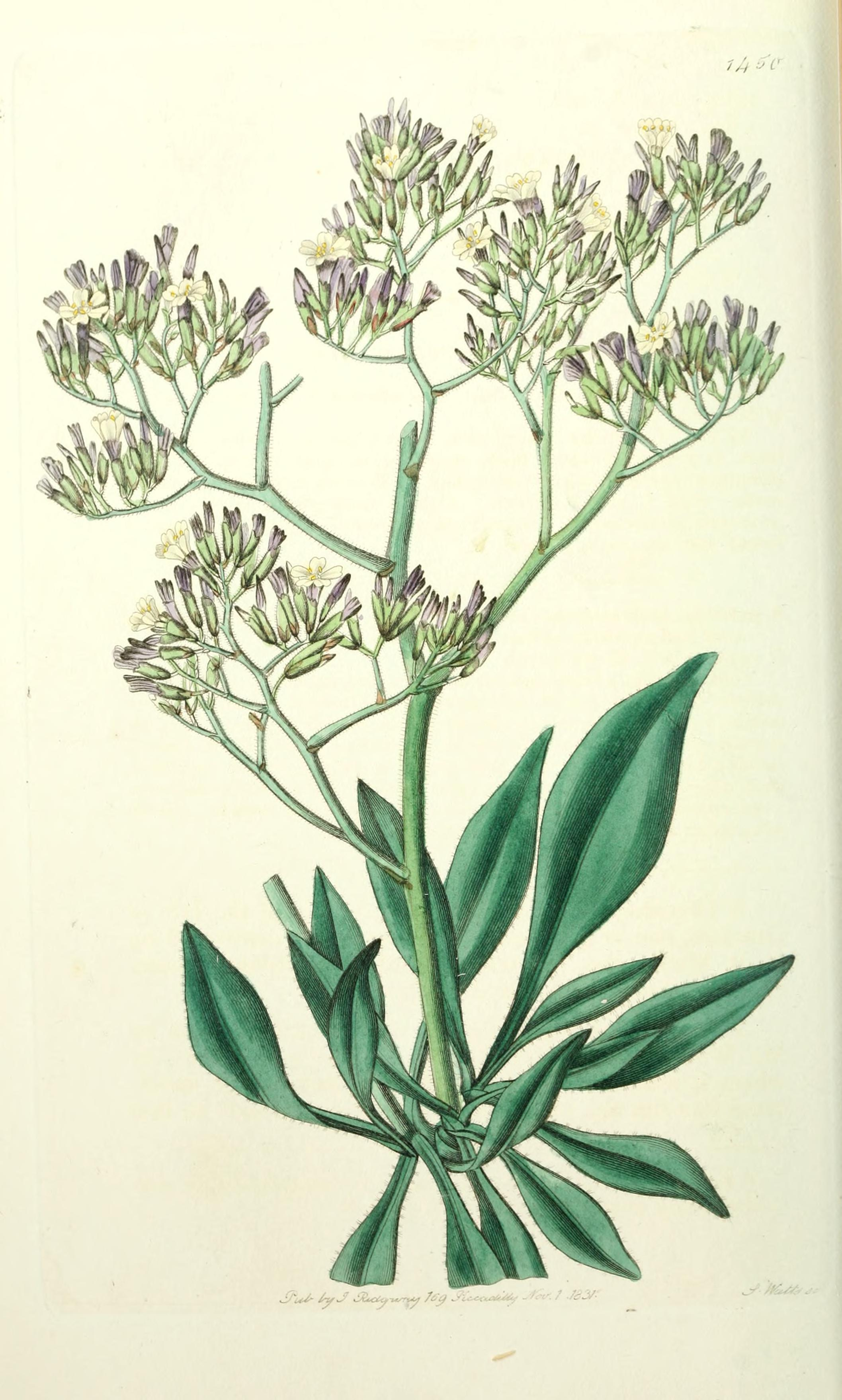
- Botanical illustration

Scientific classification
- Kingdom: Plantae
- Clade: Embryophytes
- Clade: Tracheophytes
- Clade: Angiosperms
- Clade: Eudicots
- Order: Caryophyllales
- Family: Plumbaginaceae
- Genus: Limonium
- Species: L. puberulum

Binomial name
- Limonium puberulum (Webb ex Lindl.) Kuntze

Synonyms
- Statice puberula Webb ex Lindl.

= Limonium puberulum =

Species of plant

Limonium puberulum, the downy sea lavender, is a species of flowering plant in the family Plumbaginaceae, native to subtropical elevations of Lanzarote in the Canary Islands. It is morphologically similar to but genetically distinct from Limonium bourgeaui.
