= San Ginés, Arrecife =

Cultural property in Arrecife, Spain

Coordinates: 28.9596303°N 13.5472612°W

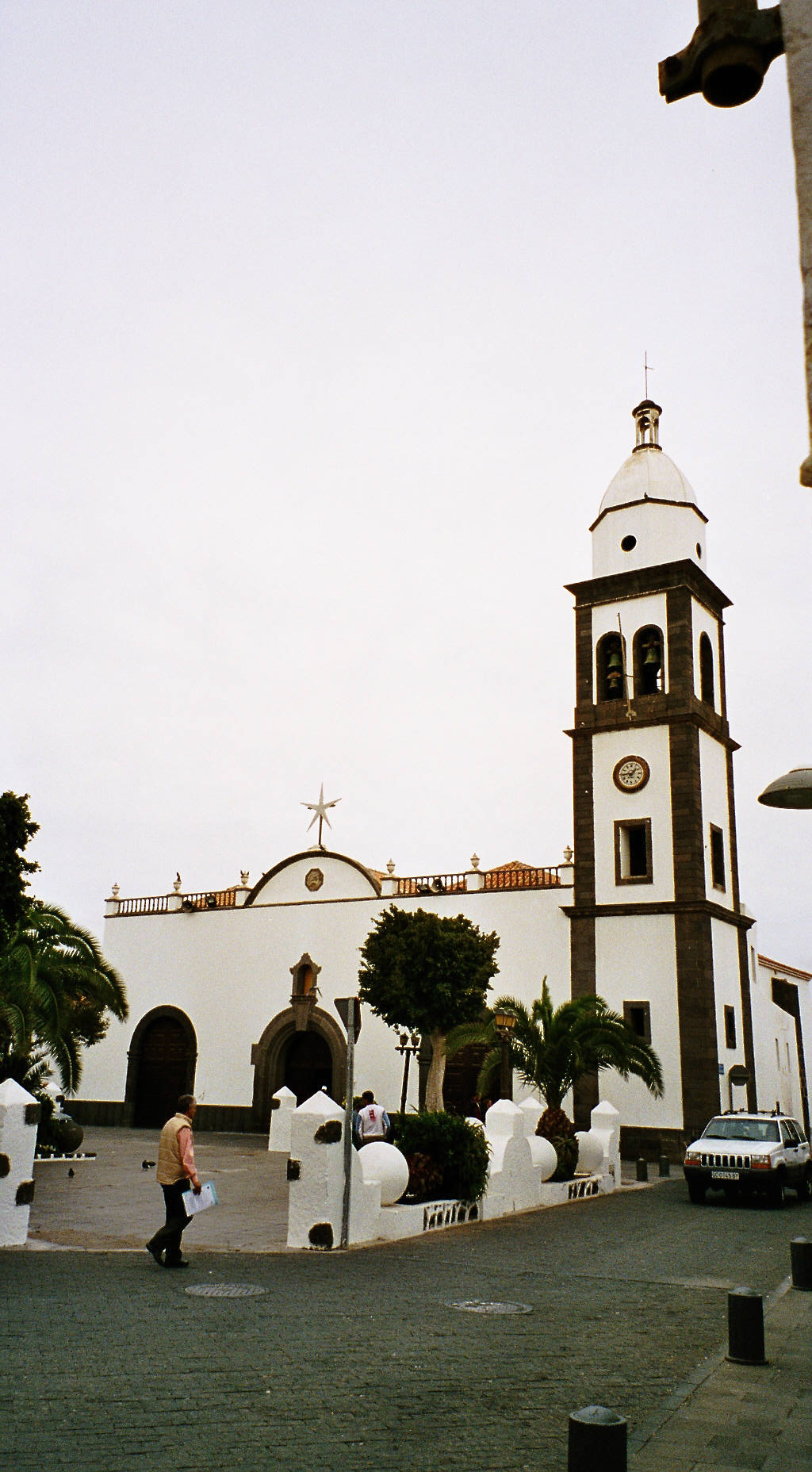
The church of San Ginés.

San Ginés is a church in Arrecife, Lanzarote, Canary Islands, Spain. Originally the location of a hermitage built in 1574 that contained images of Saint Peter and Saint Ginés, it was flooded and completely rebuilt in 1667. It was expanded in the eighteenth and nineteenth centuries. Saint Ginés (Saint Genesius of Clermont) is Arrecife's patron saint. Mass is celebrated every evening, including Saturdays, Sundays and holydays, at 7.30 p.m. There are additional Masses at weekends and on feast days. The tower of the Church of San Ginés was inspired by the bell tower of the Church of La Concepción of Santa Cruz de Tenerife.
