= Autovía LZ-3 =

Motorway in Spain

Coordinates: 28°58′32.41″N 13°33′17.94″W

Autovía LZ-3
- Circunvalación de Arrecife
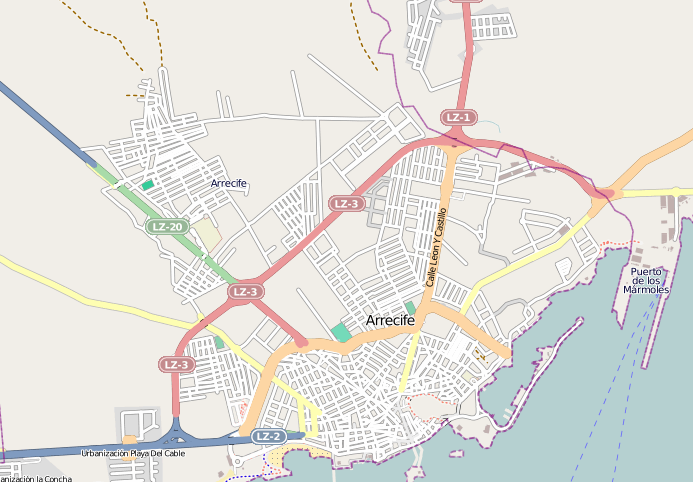

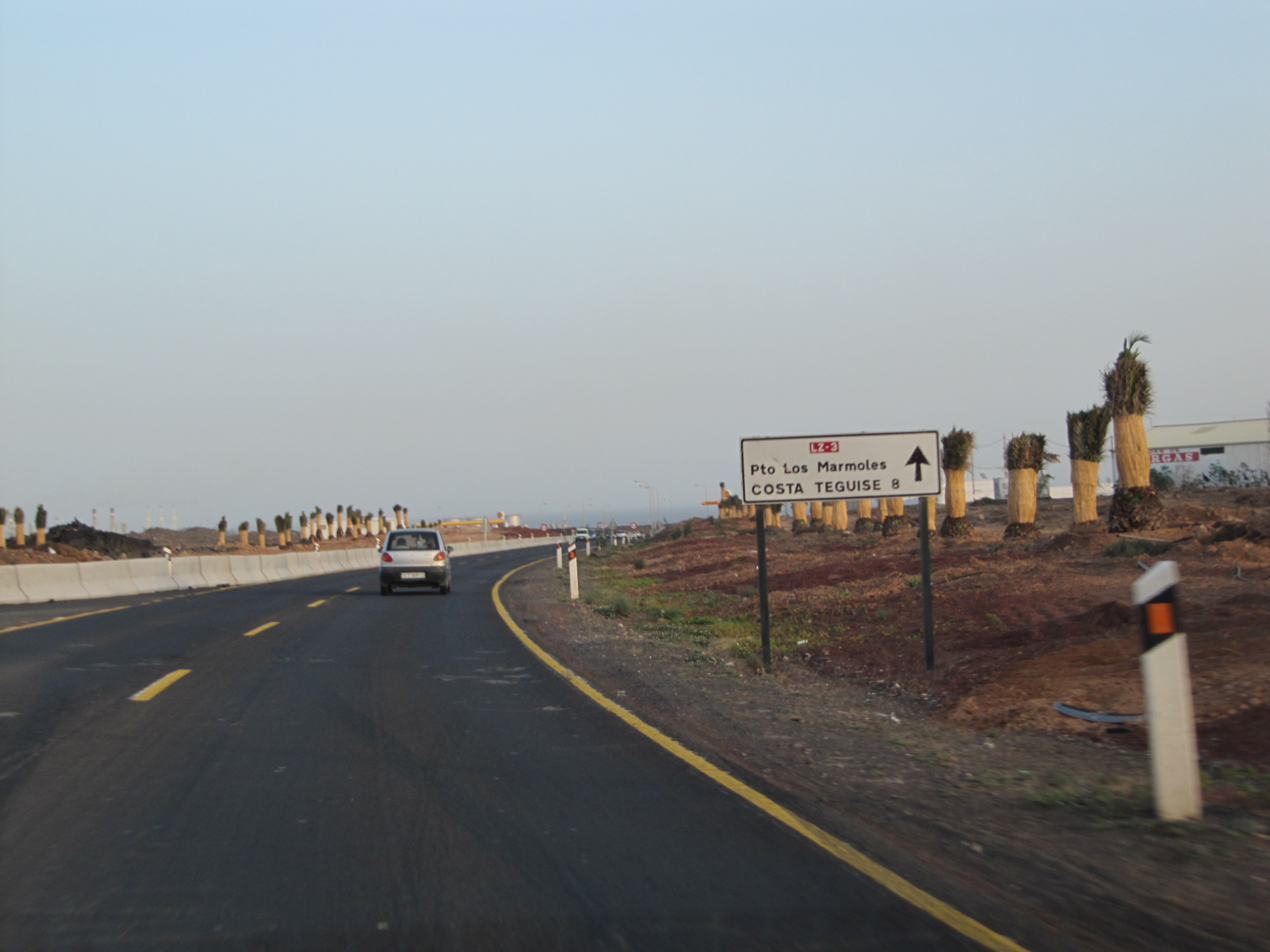
- LZ-3 during roadworks for upgrading it to a motorway

Route information
- Maintained by the Government of the Canary Islands
- Length: 5.6 km (3.5 mi)

Major junctions
- Ring road around Arrecife
- Northeast end: LZ-18
- LZ-1; LZ-20
- Southwest end: LZ-2

Location
- Country: Spain
- Autonomous community: Canary Islands
- Province: Las Palmas

Highway system
- Highways in Spain; Autopistas and autovías; National Roads; Transport in the Canary Islands

LZ-3 is an autovía (a type of highway in Spain) located on the island of Lanzarote in the Canary Islands. It serves as a ring road to the island's capital city, Arrecife.

Since Arrecife is a coastal city, the ring road does not complete a full circle. On the northern side, LZ-3 begins at a roundabout by the island's main port, Puerto de los Mármoles. On the southern side, LZ-3 ends at a junction with LZ-2, the main road leading to the south of the island. LZ-3 is also connected to LZ-1, the main road leading to the north of the island. Thus, the island's north-south axis is LZ-1–LZ-3–LZ-2, connecting the northernmost town, Órzola, to the southernmost town, Playa Blanca.

While most roads on the island are owned by the island council (cabildo insular), the entire north-south axis, including LZ-3, is owned by the Government of the Canary Islands.
