= Castillo de San José =

Museum in Spain

- Arrecife, in Lanzarote, Spain
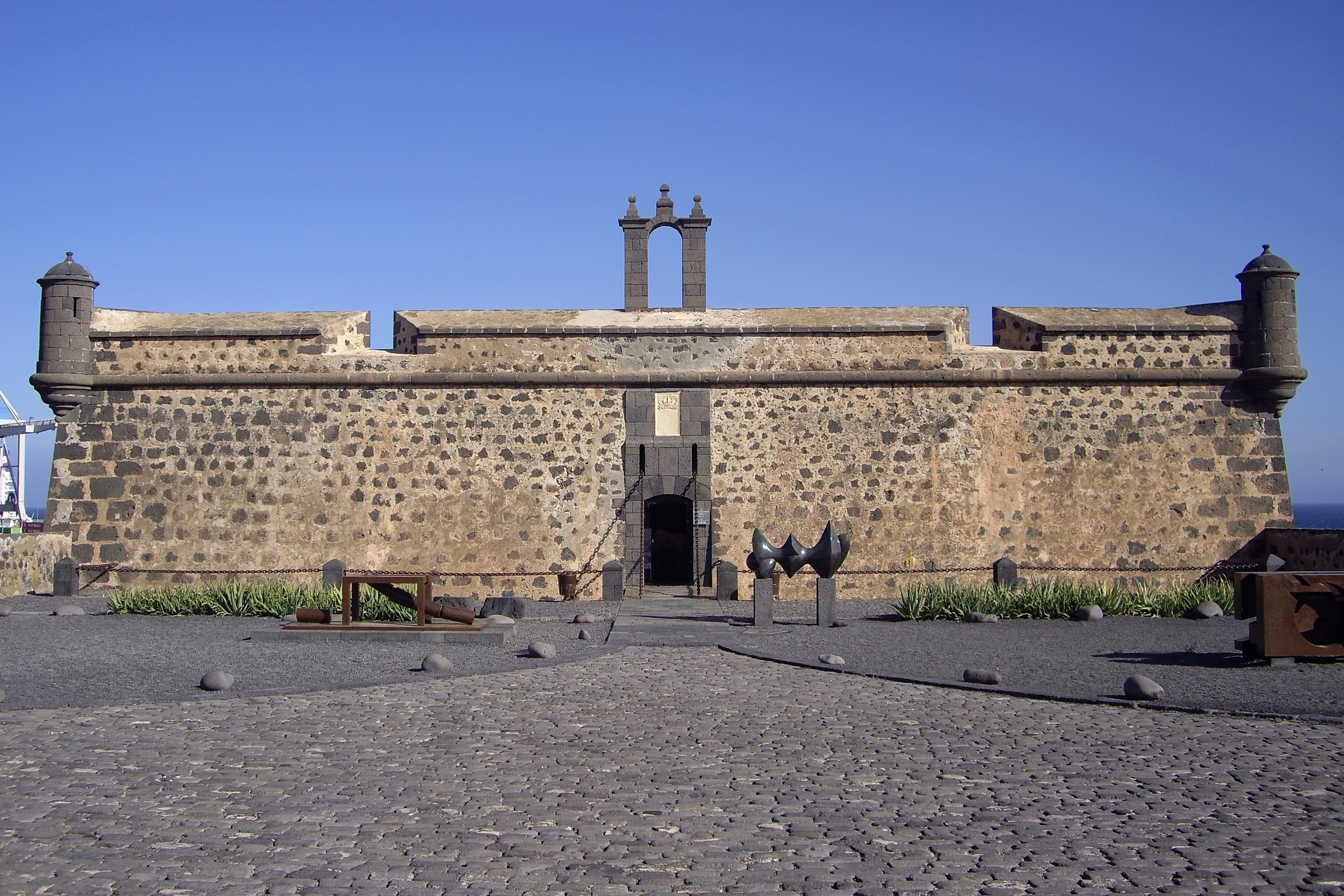
- Courtyard and gateway

Site information
- Other site facilities: Art Museum

Location
- Coordinates: 28°58′15″N 13°32′00″W

Site history
- Built: 1779

The Castillo de San José (Castle of San José) is a historic fortress and art museum in Arrecife on the Canary Island of Lanzarote.

== History ==
Built between 1776 and 1779 the fort was constructed to provide a defensive stronghold in case of pirate attacks, and as a public works project to provide much needed employment during a time of famine and poverty on the island. It became commonly known as the Fortress of Hunger (Fortaleza del hambre). The famine was caused by a number of factors including periods of drought, and the earlier eruption of Timanfaya between 1730 and 1736, which devastated most of the productive agricultural areas on the island. Charles III of Spain, who was concerned for the plight of the islanders, ordered that the fortress be built.

Situated on a cliff above the Port of Naos, the D-shaped fort has semi-circular walls facing the sea. On the landward side, the rear wall is protected by two small turrets, with a moat crossed by a lifting drawbridge leading to the main gateway. The fortress is constructed of masonry and ashlar blocks of volcanic origin. The interior which is made up of barrel vaulted rooms was mainly used as a powder store.

== International Museum of Contemporary Art ==
In the 1970s the fortress was renovated and the interior redesigned by the artist César Manrique, who was born nearby, to house a museum of modern art. The museum opened to the public in 1976 as the International Museum of Contemporary Art (Spanish: Museo Internacional de Arte Contemporaneo, abbreviated as MIAC).

The exhibits are primarily from the period between 1950 and 1980, with a focus on various abstract art forms, such as modern sculpture, kinetic art, and geometric abstraction. The works are mainly by Spanish artists including Antoni Tàpies, Eusebio Sempere and the El Paso group, one section is also dedicated to the Canarian artist Pancho Lasso.

The courtyard is also used as a display space for outdoor sculptures and designs. Beneath the museum, the annexe of the fort was renovated and converted into a restaurant, the two connected by a spiral staircase. With curved floor to ceiling windows, the dining room has panoramic views overlooking the harbour and docks below.

== Gallery ==
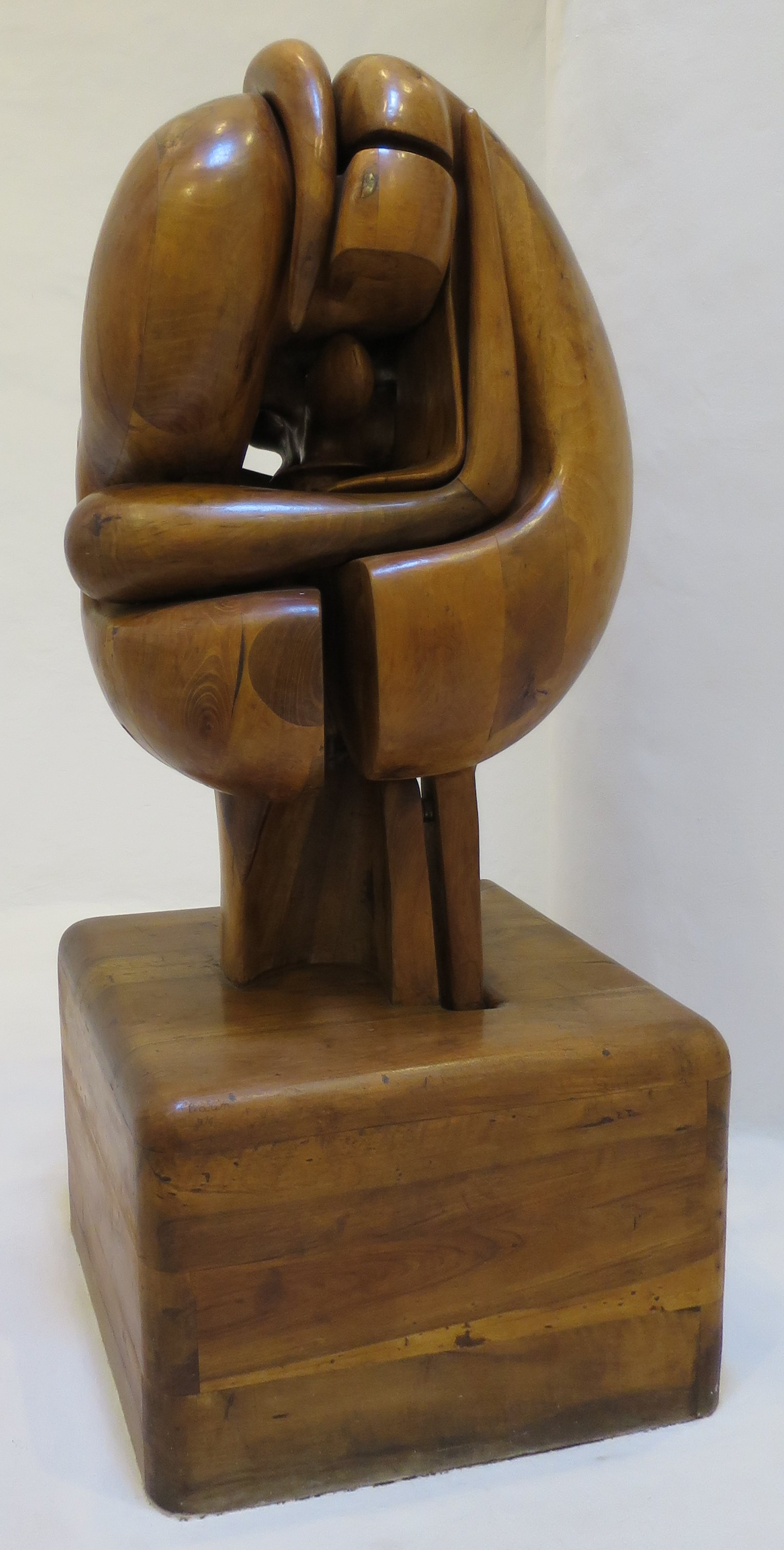
La semilla (Francisco Barón 1976)

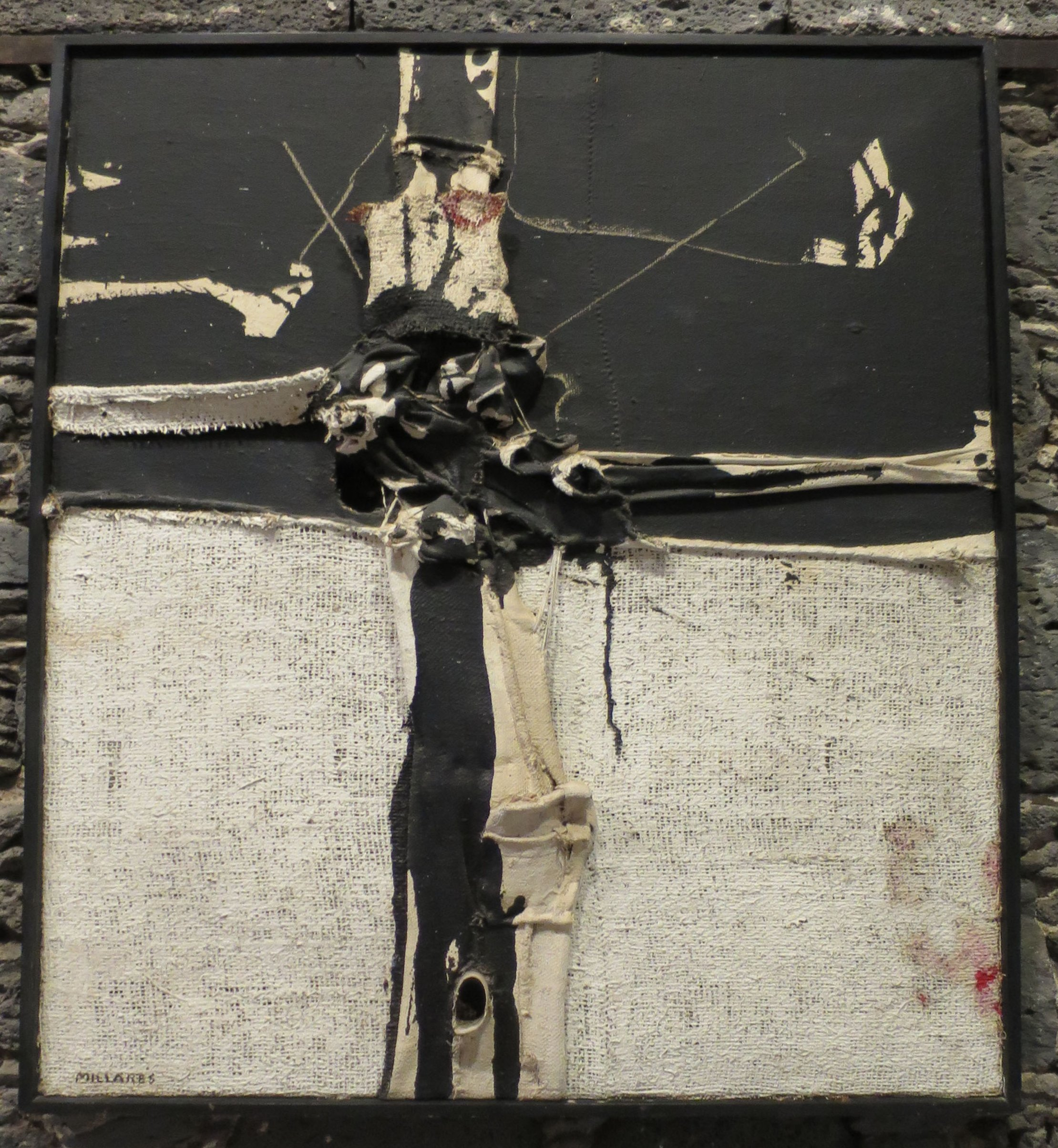
Cuadro 201 (Manuel Millares 1962)

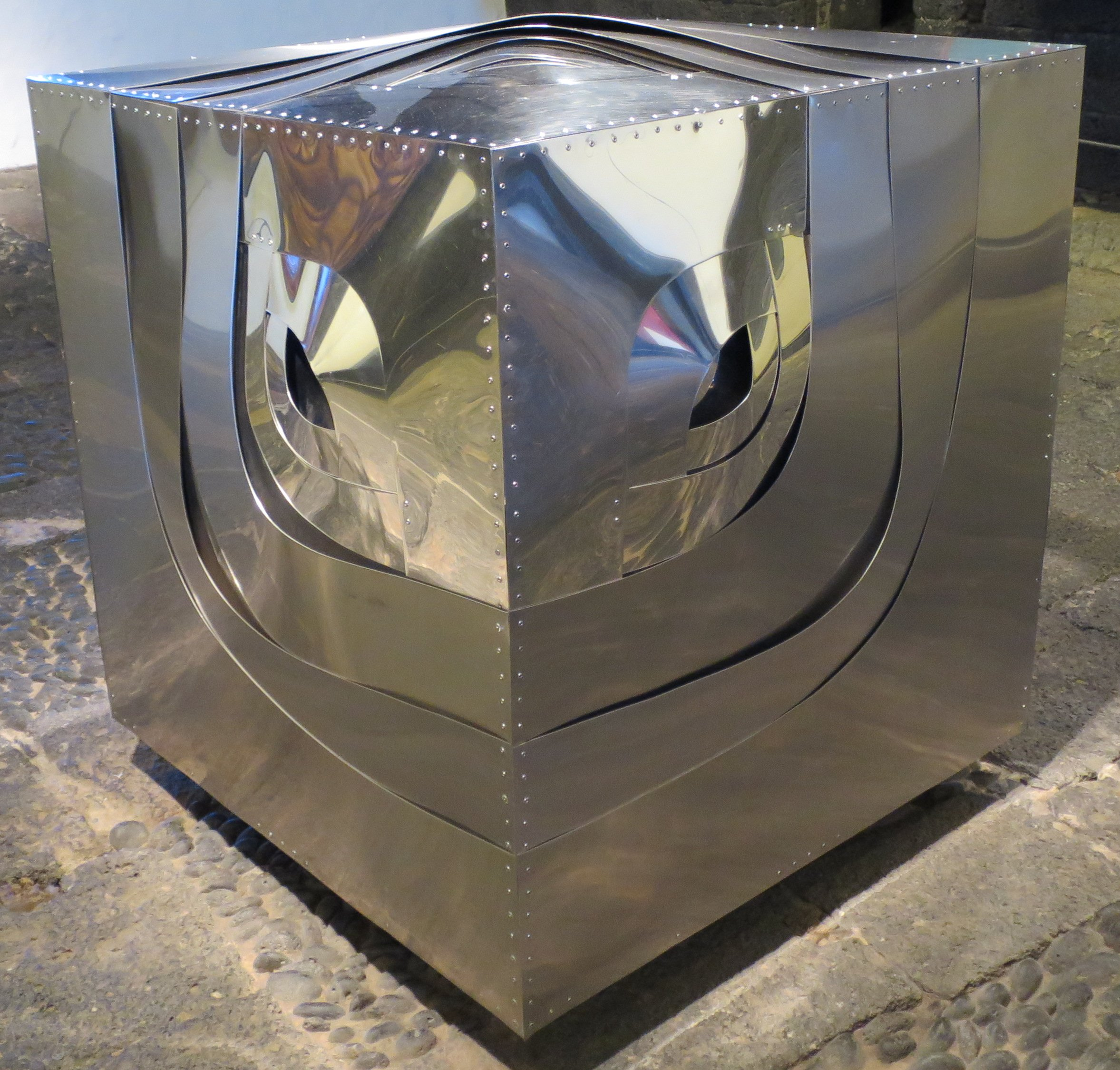
Géminis III (Amadeo Gabino 1975)

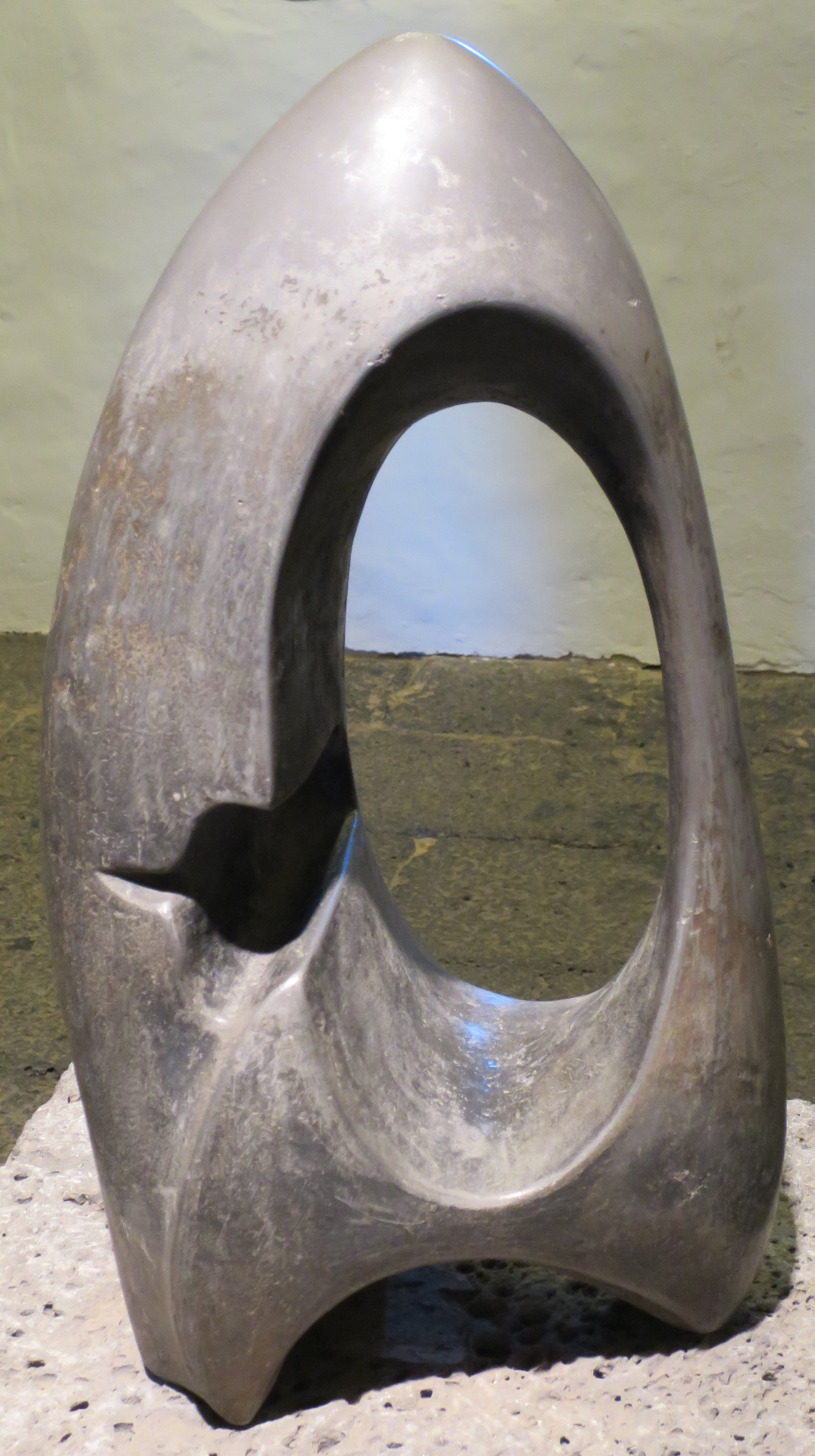
Formas de silencio (Maria Belén Morales 1976)

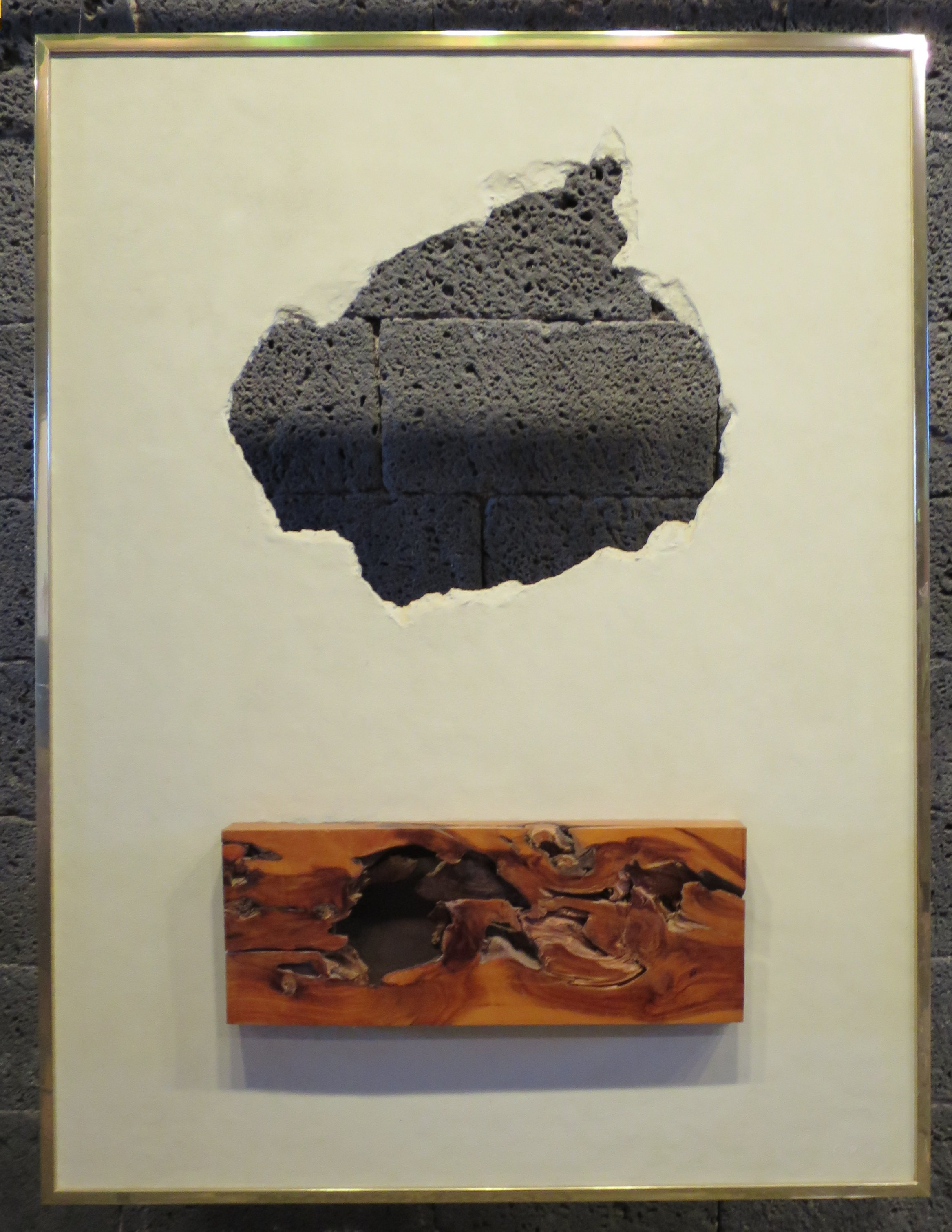
'Blanco con agujero y madera de Sabina (Gustavo Torner 1963)
