= Yaiza =

Town on Lanzarote, Canary Islands, Spain

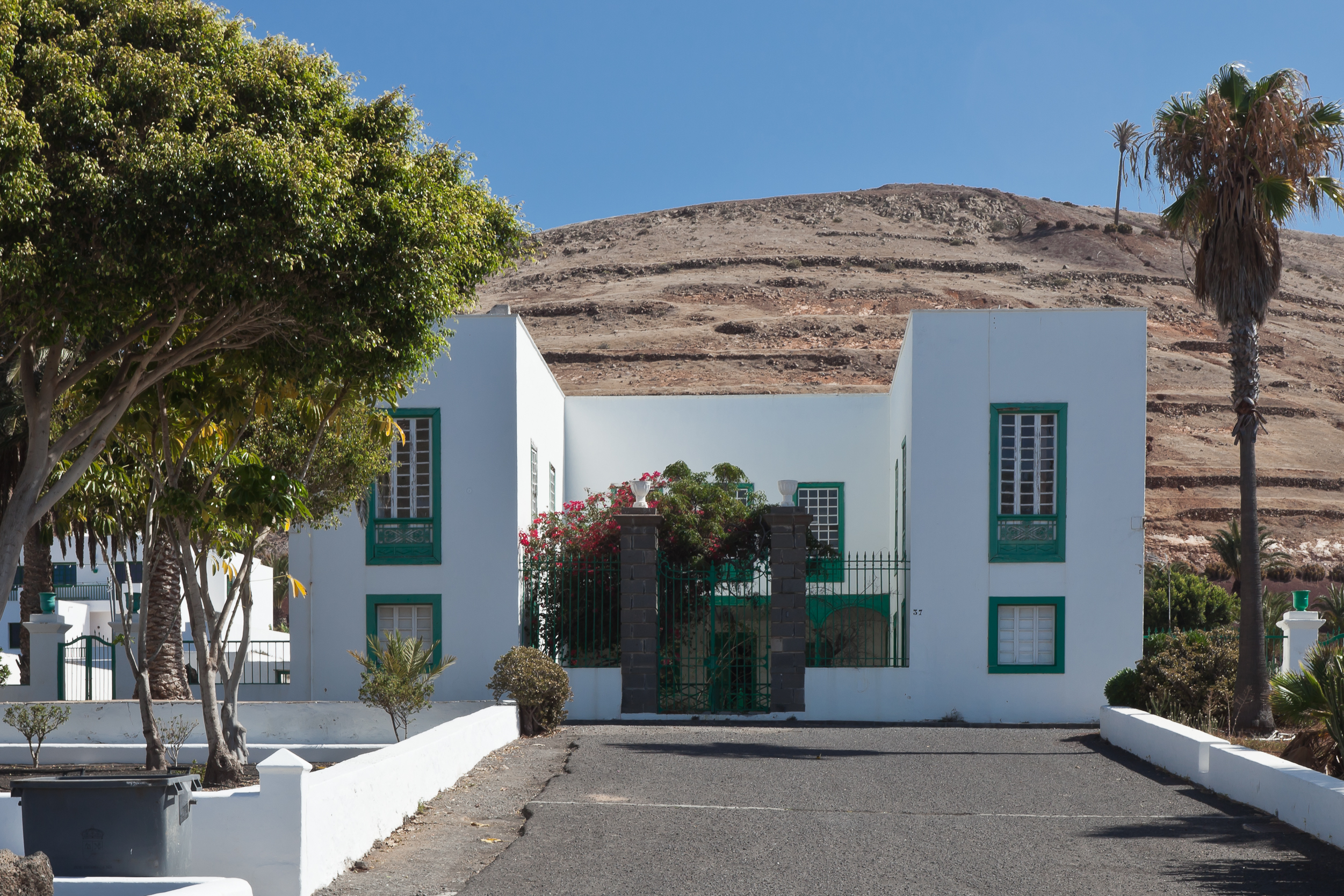

- Location in the Canary Islands / Spain Yaiza (Spain)
- Coordinates: 28°57′17″N 13°46′01″W
- Country: Spain
- Autonomous community: Canary Islands
- Province: Las Palmas
- Island: Lanzarote
- Municipality: Yaiza
- Elevation: 6 m (20 ft)

Population (2012)
  - Total: 857
- Time zone: UTC+0 (WET)

Yaiza is a small town in the island of Lanzarote in the Canary Islands, Spain. It lies in the southwest of the island. The population in 2012 was 857. The town gives its name to the municipality of Yaiza, although it is much smaller than the largest settlement in the municipality, Playa Blanca.

The town has a town hall, tree-lined streets, and a floodlit public football stadium.

Each year, at Christmas, Yaiza displays a large "Belén" (a belén is a nativity scene). The Yaiza Belén includes miniaturised scenes from around the island, with miniatures of Playa Blanca, Arrecife, and Timanfaya. Children and visitors are encouraged to seek the caganer, a figurine of a young man defecating, as it is considered good luck to spot him.

Highway LZ2 connects the town to Playa Blanca in the south and Arrecife to the east.

== Geography and climate ==
Yaiza has a hot desert climate (Köppen: BWh; Trewartha: BWal) with an annual precipitation of only 97.8 millimetres (3.85 in) and no more than 24 days of precipitation.

Climate data for Yaiza Climate ID: C019V; coordinates 28°51′27″N 13°50′10″W; elevation: 6 m (20 ft); 1991–2020 normals, extremes 1992–present
Month	Jan	Feb	Mar	Apr	May	Jun	Jul	Aug	Sep	Oct	Nov	Dec	Year
Record high °C (°F)	27.5 (81.5)	28.8 (83.8)	33.7 (92.7)	33.6 (92.5)	38.8 (101.8)	35.0 (95.0)	44.0 (111.2)	44.2 (111.6)	33.4 (92.1)	34.4 (93.9)	30.5 (86.9)	28.0 (82.4)	44.2 (111.6)
Mean maximum °C (°F)	22.6 (72.7)	23.7 (74.7)	25.6 (78.1)	26.6 (79.9)	27.2 (81.0)	28.1 (82.6)	31.7 (89.1)	32.2 (90.0)	29.5 (85.1)	29.3 (84.7)	27.0 (80.6)	23.4 (74.1)	35.2 (95.4)
Mean daily maximum °C (°F)	20.0 (68.0)	20.4 (68.7)	21.2 (70.2)	22.0 (71.6)	22.8 (73.0)	24.1 (75.4)	25.9 (78.6)	26.9 (80.4)	26.4 (79.5)	25.3 (77.5)	23.1 (73.6)	21.1 (70.0)	23.3 (73.9)
Daily mean °C (°F)	17.5 (63.5)	17.7 (63.9)	18.4 (65.1)	19.3 (66.7)	20.2 (68.4)	21.5 (70.7)	23.1 (73.6)	24.0 (75.2)	23.7 (74.7)	22.6 (72.7)	20.4 (68.7)	18.7 (65.7)	20.6 (69.1)
Mean daily minimum °C (°F)	14.9 (58.8)	14.9 (58.8)	15.5 (59.9)	16.5 (61.7)	17.6 (63.7)	18.9 (66.0)	20.2 (68.4)	21.1 (70.0)	20.9 (69.6)	19.8 (67.6)	17.6 (63.7)	16.2 (61.2)	17.9 (64.2)
Mean minimum °C (°F)	11.6 (52.9)	11.9 (53.4)	12.7 (54.9)	13.6 (56.5)	15.1 (59.2)	16.6 (61.9)	18.5 (65.3)	19.6 (67.3)	18.8 (65.8)	17.0 (62.6)	14.2 (57.6)	13.1 (55.6)	10.5 (50.9)
Record low °C (°F)	8.0 (46.4)	8.2 (46.8)	10.0 (50.0)	10.6 (51.1)	13.0 (55.4)	11.4 (52.5)	16.0 (60.8)	18.0 (64.4)	16.0 (60.8)	13.6 (56.5)	10.0 (50.0)	9.6 (49.3)	8.0 (46.4)
Average precipitation mm (inches)	17.7 (0.70)	12.9 (0.51)	11.7 (0.46)	3.5 (0.14)	0.9 (0.04)	0.3 (0.01)	0.1 (0.00)	0.7 (0.03)	1.9 (0.07)	12.7 (0.50)	18.2 (0.72)	17.3 (0.68)	97.8 (3.85)
Average precipitation days (≥ 0.1 mm)	3.63	2.82	2.39	1.69	0.42	0.30	0.08	0.24	1.35	2.92	3.73	3.96	23.54
Average relative humidity (%)	74	74	75	76	77	77	77	80	80	80	77	75	77
Percentage possible sunshine	65	68	69	67	73	71	71	77	74	71	66	64	70
Source: State Meteorological Agency/AEMET OpenData
