= LZ-1 road (Spain) =

Road in the Canary Islands

LZ-1
- Carretera nacional N-LZ-1
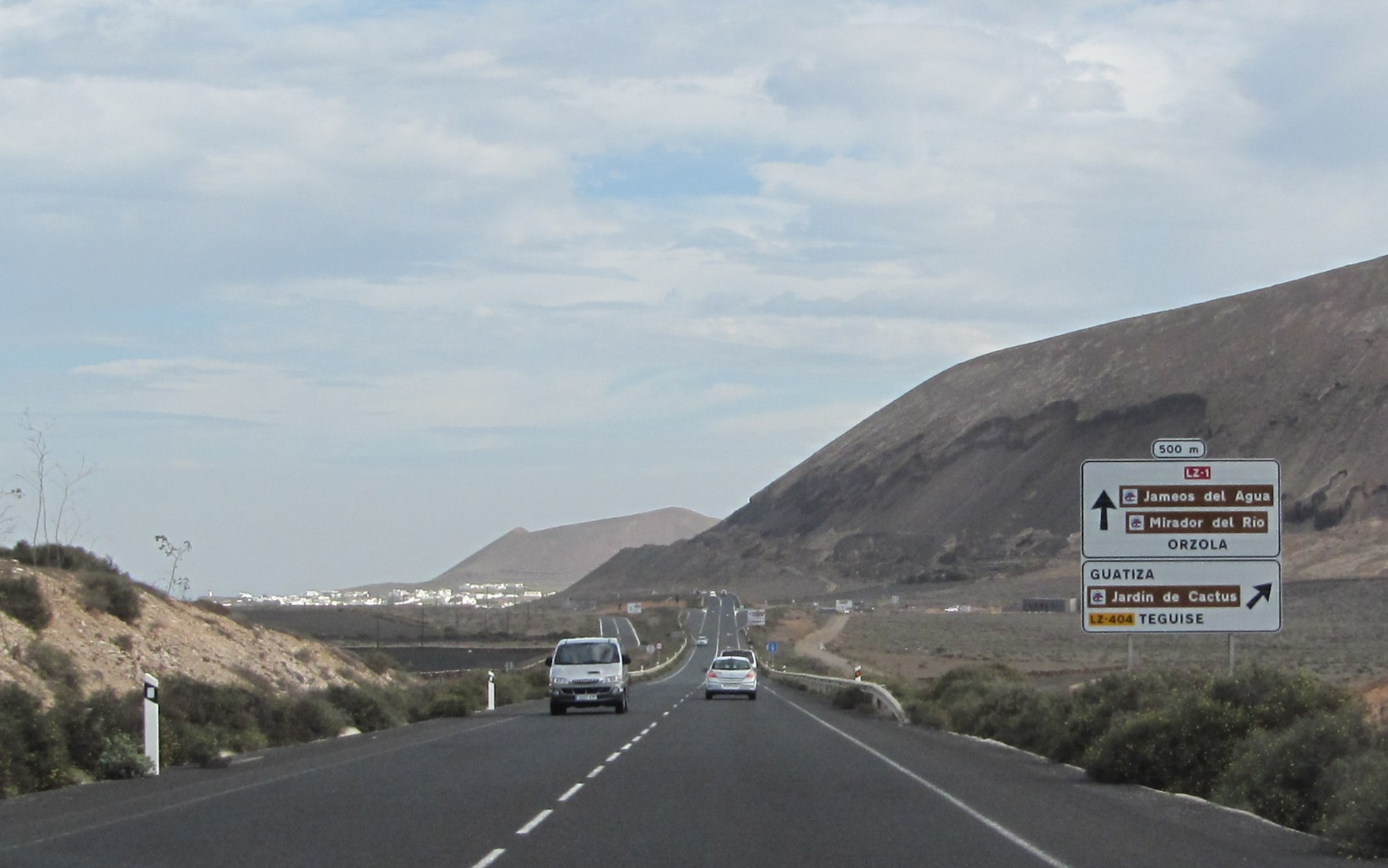
- LZ-1 near Guatiza

Route information
- Maintained by the Government of the Canary Islands
- Length: 32.9 km (20.4 mi)

Major junctions
- South end: Arrecife
- LZ-3; LZ-34; LZ-10; LZ-14; LZ-207; LZ-10; LZ-201; LZ-204
- North end: Órzola

Location
- Country: Spain
- Autonomous community: Canary Islands
- Province: Las Palmas
- Towns: Arrecife, Tahiche, Guatiza, Mala, Arrieta, Punta Mujeres and Órzola

Highway system
- Highways in Spain; Autopistas and autovías; National Roads; Transport in the Canary Islands

LZ-1 is one of the main roads on the island of Lanzarote in the Canary Islands. It leads north from the island's capital, Arrecife, ending at the island's northernmost town of Órzola.

Although most of the island's roads are owned by the island council (cabildo insular), roads of major importance such as the LZ-1 are owned by the Government of the Canary Islands.
