= Puerto del Carmen =

- Town
- Location within Lanzarote Location within Canary Islands
- Coordinates: 28°55′22″N 13°38′58″W
- Country: Spain
- Autonomous Community: Canary Islands
- Province: Las Palmas
- Island: Lanzarote
- Municipality: Tías
- Time zone: UTC+00:00 (WET)
  - Summer (DST): UTC+01:00 (WEST)
- Postcode: 35510

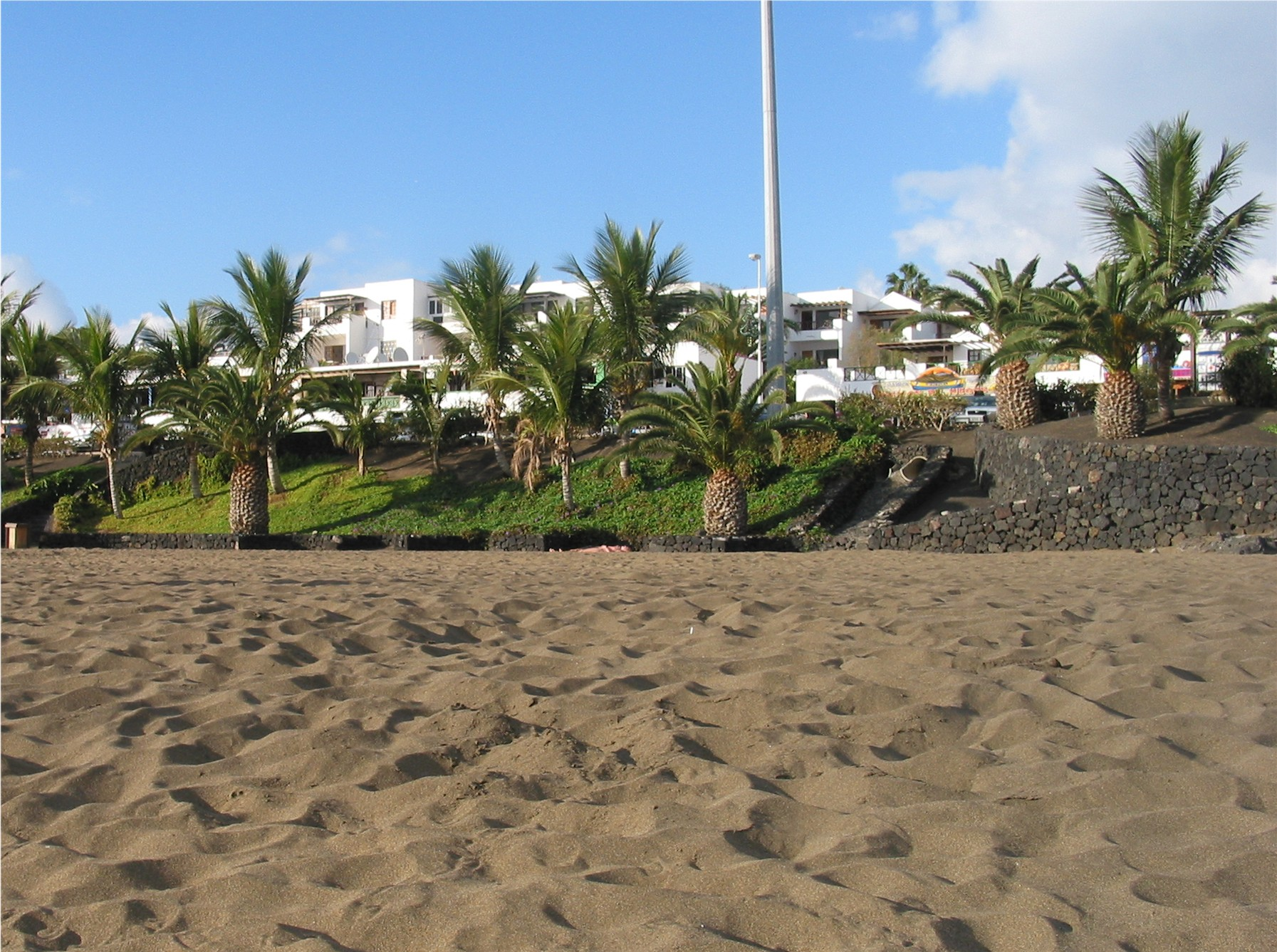
A beach with a view to Avenida de las Playas.

Puerto del Carmen (Pto. del Carmen) is the main tourist town on the island of Lanzarote, Canary Islands, Spain. It is part of the municipality of Tías. Most of Lanzarote's over 1 million visitors per year choose this town as their destination. As a result, almost all of the town's economy revolves around tourism.

== History ==
The area of Puerto del Carmen was inhabited before the arrival of the Normans on the island and, at least since the 16th century, known as Tiñosa, so it appears on the maps of Torriani (as Tinosa), Brihuela/Cosala (as La Tiñosa), P.A. del Castillo (as La Tiñoça) and Riviere (as La Tinosa). This toponym is probably of Guanche origin, adapted to the phonetics of Spanish and related to other lexical variants such as Tiñor in El Hierro or Tiñoa in Tenerife.

After The Conquest it becomes a place of anchorage. In 1591 Leonardo Torriani, refers to the natural port of La Tiñosa. Later on, it became important with the barrel trade.

In 1900 it was declared a Port of General Interest, a distinction it lost in 1928 in favour of Arrecife. In 1904, La Tiñosa became a town with 194 inhabitants, mainly dedicated to fishing. In 1957, the small fishing village was renamed Puerto del Carmen, in honour of Nuestra Señora del Carmen.

The promenade known as "Avenida de las Playas" contains many restaurants, shops, bars and casinos.

From the coast it has been extending inland, up to a distance of approximately one kilometre.

== Tourism ==
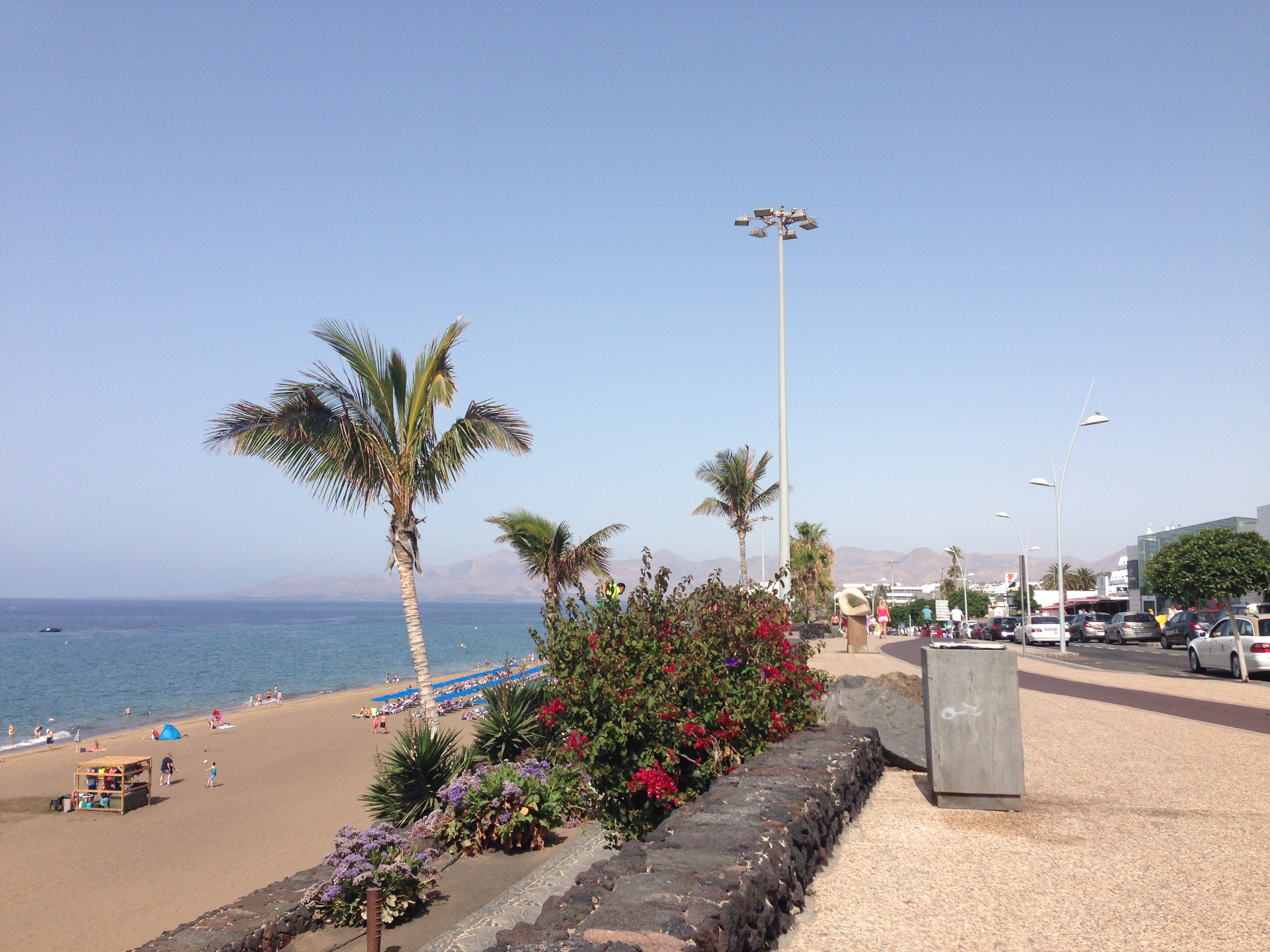
Beach of Puerto del Carmen (June 2015)

Since the opening of the Hotel los Fariones in 1967 it has attracted tourists from all over Europe, particularly Ireland, the UK and Germany as well as from Scandinavia and mainland Spain. The Avenida de las Playas, the main street/avenue in the town, extends some 7 km along the island's southern coast, with beaches on one side and many restaurants, bars, shops and other tourist attractions on the other. Apartments, villas and hotels cover a kilometre or so inland from the coastline. The old town includes the harbour and docks, the Puerto Tinosa. Here there are a smaller variety of restaurants and bars with views across the harbour and the sea to the volcanic mountains of Papagayo beyond to views of another Canary Island: Fuerteventura.

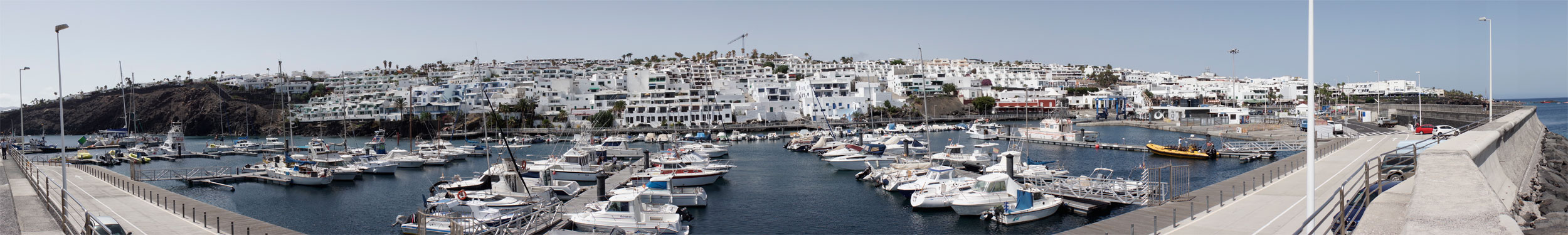
Vista del Puerto de La Tiñosa.

== Scuba diving ==
Puerto del Carmen is host to a large number of dive centres and scuba diving is one of the most popular sports there with very favourable conditions all year round. Water temperatures vary from 19 °C in the winter to 23 °C in the summer and visibility averages over 25 metres to 30 metres. Playa Chica is based in the old town of Puerto Del Carmen and is home to over 10 dive sites, with dives available from shore and boat.

== Shopping and dining ==
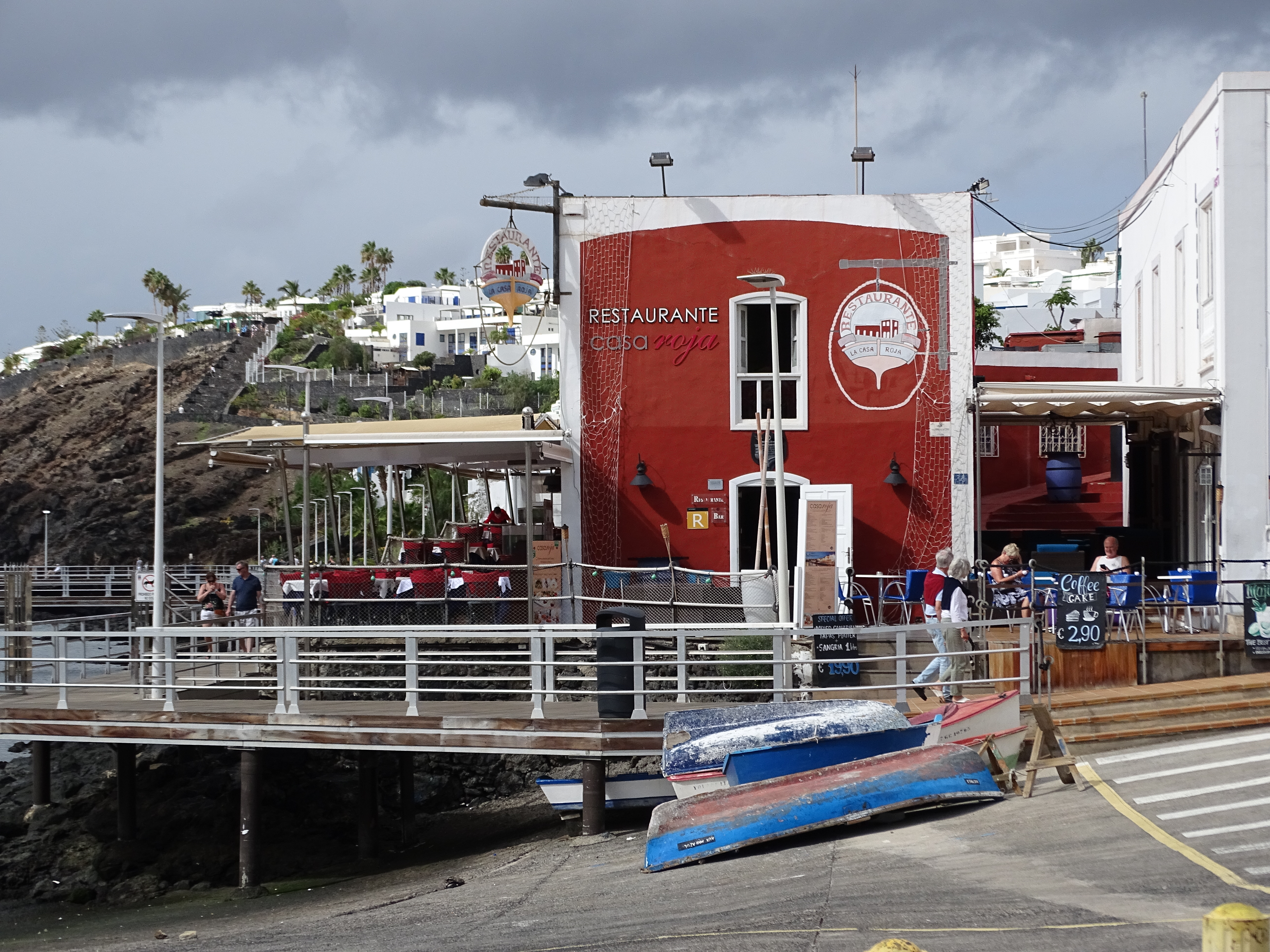
The old restaurant «La casa roja» in the old harbour

Puerto Del Carmen hosts a variety of shops which sell mainly tourist-oriented products. The new town hosts bars, restaurants and tourist shops. The old town has many restaurants with outdoor terraces that overlook the marina below and the distant volcanic peaks. The Biosfera Plaza is a shopping plaza, opened in 2002, which includes many international brands and has entertainment facilities. There are a handful of clubs open until the early hours (some until 6am), which are often popular with many younger tourists.
