= Tías, Las Palmas =

Tías
- Municipality
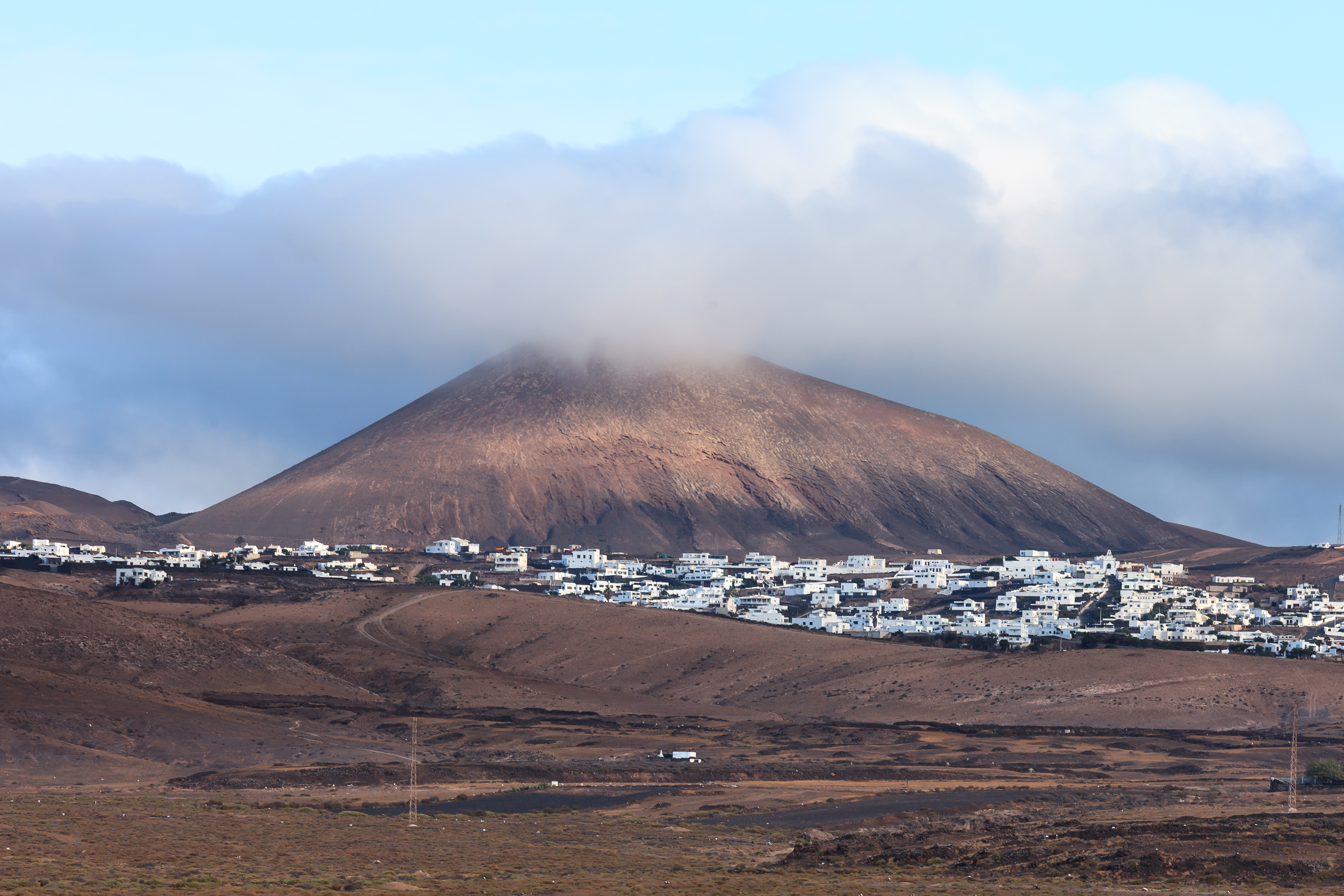
- View of Tías

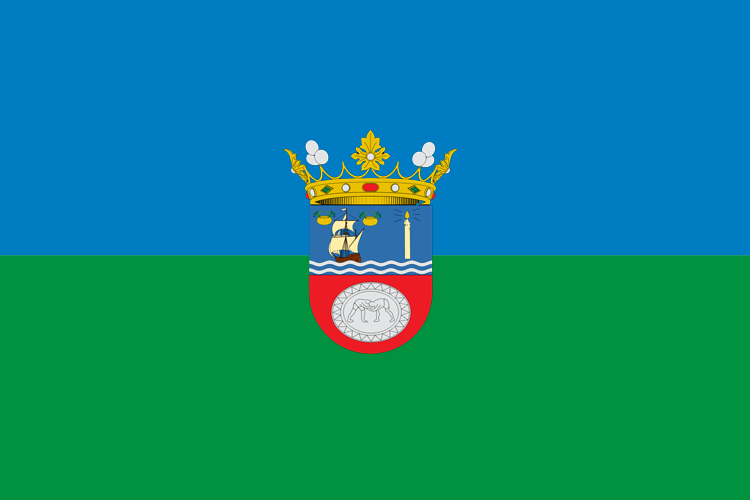
- Flag Coat of arms

- Municipal location in Lanzarote

- Location in the province of Las Palmas Tías (Canary Islands) Tías (Spain, Canary Islands)
- Coordinates: 28°57′N 13°39′W
- Country: Spain
- Autonomous community: Canary Islands
- Province: Las Palmas

Government
  - Mayor: José Juan Cruz Saavedra (PSOE)

Area
  - Total: 64.61 km^{2} (24.95 sq mi)
- Elevation: 200 m (660 ft)

Population (2025-01-01)
  - Total: 21,613
  - Density: 334.5/km^{2} (866.4/sq mi)
- Demonym: Tienses
- Time zone: UTC±0 (WET)
  - Summer (DST): UTC+1 (WEST)
- Postal code: 35572
- Website: Official website

Tías is a town and a municipality in the southern part of the island of Lanzarote, province of Las Palmas, autonomous community of the Canary Islands, Spain. The town Tías is situated 4 km from the south coast and 10 km west of the island capital Arrecife.

Lanzarote's largest tourist resort, Puerto del Carmen, is entirely in the municipality of Tías, and was the location of the first hotels ever built on the island, Gran Hotel, and the Fariones hotel, both opened in 1967. Other settlements in the municipality are Mácher, La Asomada, Conil, Masdache.

== Notable residents ==
The town of Tías is or has been home to:

- José Saramago, Portuguese writer, playwright and journalist, Nobel Prize for Literature 1998
- Alberto Vazquez-Figueroa, Spanish writer and novelist
- Helen Lindes, Spanish model, Miss Spain 2000 and runner-up to Miss Universe 2000
- Guillermina Fernández Díaz, born June 1902, the oldest Canary Island resident

== Sister towns ==
- Adeje, Spain
- Azinhaga, Portugal (birthplace of José Saramago)
- Castril, Spain
- Llanes, Spain

== See also ==
- List of municipalities in Las Palmas
