= Arrecife =

- City
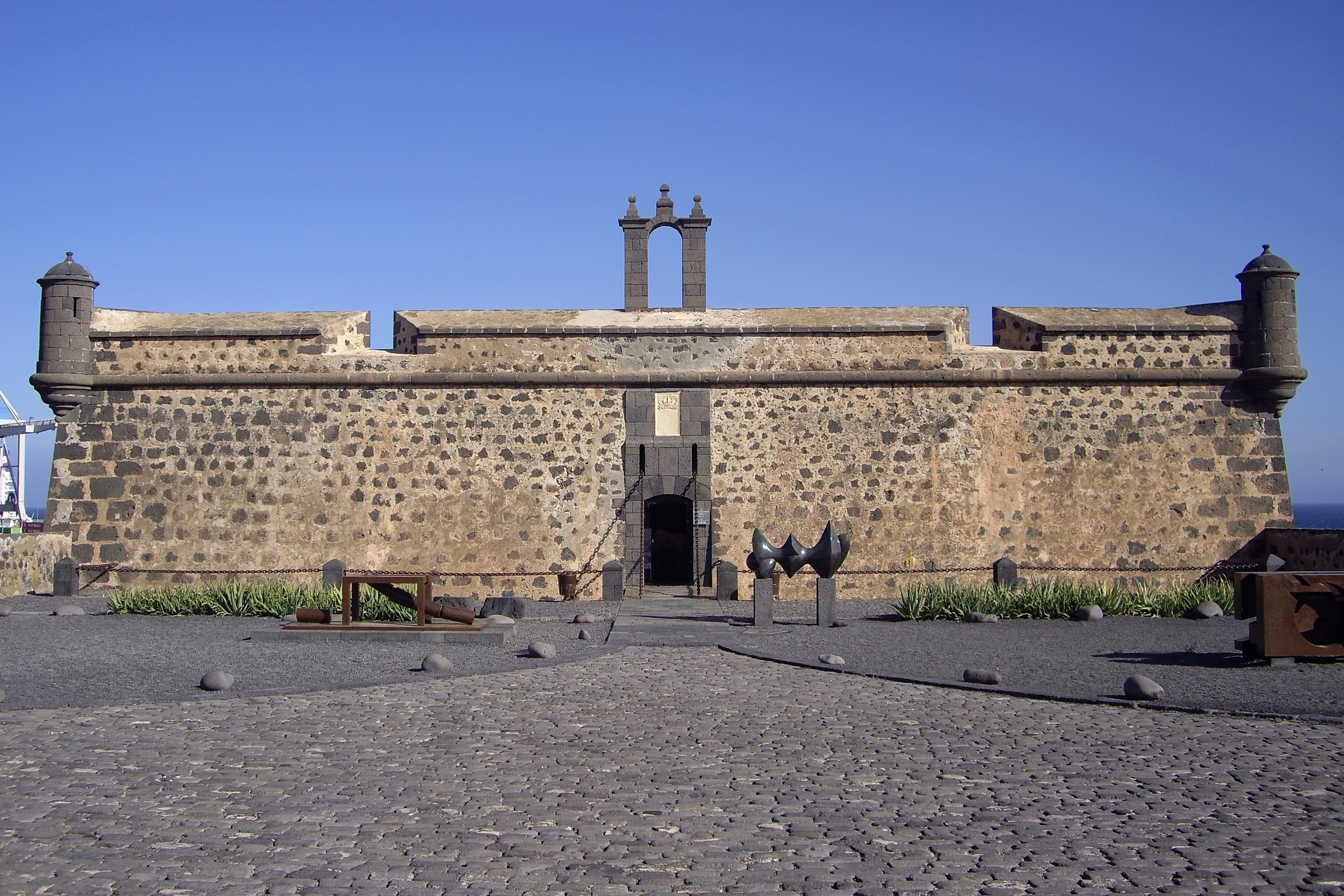
- Port of Arrecife, with San Ginés and Castillo de San José and other city landmarks

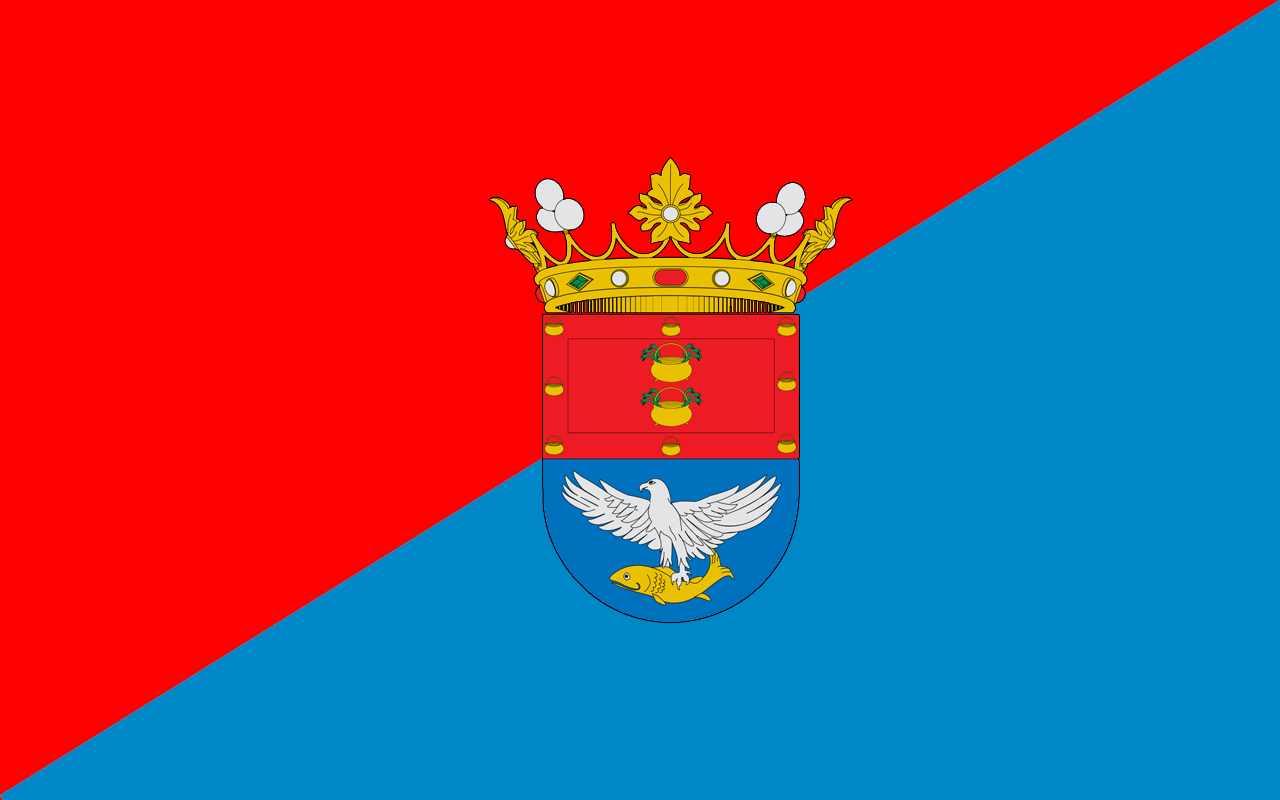
- Flag Coat of arms
- Interactive map of Arrecife
- Location within Lanzarote Location within Canary Islands Location within Spain, Canary Islands
- Coordinates: 28°57′45″N 13°33′2″W
- Country: Spain
- Autonomous Community: Canary Islands
- Province: Las Palmas
- Island: Lanzarote

Government
  - Mayor: Ástrid Pérez Batista (PP)

Area
  - Total: 22.72 km^{2} (8.77 sq mi)
- Elevation (AMSL): 20 m (66 ft)

Population (2025-01-01)
  - Total: 70,811
  - Density: 3,117/km^{2} (8,072/sq mi)
- Time zone: UTC+00:00 (WET)
  - Summer (DST): UTC+01:00 (WEST)
- Postal code: 35500
- Area code: +34 (Spain) + 928 (Las Palmas)
- Website: www.arrecife.es

Arrecife (/ˌærəˈsiːfeɪ/; Spanish: [areˈθife]; locally [areˈsife]) is the capital city and a municipality of Lanzarote in the Canary Islands, Spain. It was made the island's capital in 1852. The city owes its name to the rock reef ("arrecife" being Spanish for "reef") which covers its local beach. It also gives its name to the nearby Arrecife Airport. By 2025, the population of the municipality was 70,265, and the population of the city was 52,079. Its area is 22.72 square kilometres (8.77 sq mi).

Arrecife is located south of Teguise and east of San Bartolomé, and is bordered by the Atlantic Ocean to its southeast. It is a port town, served by ferries to the other Canary Islands, Europe, and Africa. The LZ1 road connects Arrecife to the northeast of the island, the LZ2 road connects it to the southwest, and the LZ3 road serves as the city's beltway. The tallest building in Lanzarote is the Arrecife Gran Hotel, which is located on the seafront alongside the harbour.

== History ==
The earliest records of Arrecife date from the fifteenth century when it was a small fishing settlement. The name, given then as Arrecifes, refers to the black volcanic reefs behind which boats could hide, protected from sudden pirate attacks.

Towards the end of the sixteenth century the settlement began to grow in response to a need for accommodation and warehousing to support growing trade between the old and new worlds. The first church was constructed at this time, consecrated to the first bishop of Arrecife, San Ginés. Growing prosperity increased the attractiveness of the town as a pirate target: in 1571 a pirate named Dogan plundered and almost completely destroyed the little port town.

In 1964 Arrecife became the site of Lanzarote's first sea-water desalination plant.

== Climate ==
Arrecife has a tropical hot desert climate (BWh) according to the Köppen climate classification. The little precipitation is concentrated in the winter months.

Climate data for Lanzarote Airport (1991-2020), extremes (1972-present)
Month	Jan	Feb	Mar	Apr	May	Jun	Jul	Aug	Sep	Oct	Nov	Dec	Year
Record high °C (°F)	27.9 (82.2)	29.4 (84.9)	34.4 (93.9)	36.3 (97.3)	42.6 (108.7)	40.7 (105.3)	43.4 (110.1)	43.6 (110.5)	40.5 (104.9)	37.3 (99.1)	34.2 (93.6)	27.5 (81.5)	43.6 (110.5)
Mean daily maximum °C (°F)	20.9 (69.6)	21.5 (70.7)	22.9 (73.2)	23.8 (74.8)	25.2 (77.4)	26.7 (80.1)	28.5 (83.3)	29.5 (85.1)	28.6 (83.5)	27.0 (80.6)	24.3 (75.7)	22.0 (71.6)	25.1 (77.1)
Daily mean °C (°F)	17.6 (63.7)	18.0 (64.4)	19.1 (66.4)	20.0 (68.0)	21.4 (70.5)	23.0 (73.4)	24.6 (76.3)	25.6 (78.1)	24.8 (76.6)	23.3 (73.9)	20.9 (69.6)	18.8 (65.8)	21.4 (70.6)
Mean daily minimum °C (°F)	14.2 (57.6)	14.4 (57.9)	15.2 (59.4)	16.1 (61.0)	17.5 (63.5)	19.2 (66.6)	20.7 (69.3)	21.5 (70.7)	21.0 (69.8)	19.6 (67.3)	17.4 (63.3)	15.5 (59.9)	17.7 (63.9)
Record low °C (°F)	8.0 (46.4)	7.6 (45.7)	8.3 (46.9)	9.5 (49.1)	11.5 (52.7)	12.4 (54.3)	15.4 (59.7)	16.6 (61.9)	15.5 (59.9)	12.0 (53.6)	10.9 (51.6)	9.0 (48.2)	7.6 (45.7)
Average precipitation mm (inches)	15.4 (0.61)	16.1 (0.63)	12.2 (0.48)	4.1 (0.16)	1.2 (0.05)	0.1 (0.00)	0.0 (0.0)	0.5 (0.02)	1.8 (0.07)	12.8 (0.50)	15.8 (0.62)	21.4 (0.84)	101.4 (3.98)
Average precipitation days (≥ 1 mm)	2.8	2.5	2.2	0.9	0.3	0.0	0.0	0.1	0.4	2.1	3.0	3.2	17.5
Average relative humidity (%)	66	66	65	64	64	65	66	67	69	69	67	69	66
Mean monthly sunshine hours	204.6	200.6	248.0	258.0	294.5	291.0	313.1	303.8	261.0	232.5	204.0	201.5	3,012.6
Percentage possible sunshine	63	63	67	67	70	69	73	74	70	66	63	63	67
Source: Agencia Estatal de Meteorología

== Historical population ==
Historical population

Year	Pop.	±% p.a.
1996	38,091	—
2000	43,711	+3.50%
2005	53,920	+4.29%
2010	58,156	+1.52%

Year	Pop.	±% p.a.
2015	56,940	−0.42%
2018	61,351	+2.52%
2020	64,645	+2.65%

Source: Centro de Datos, Cabildo de Lanzarote

== Economy ==
The Port of Arrecife is the main port facility for Lanzarote and the second busiest in the Canary Islands in terms of passengers. It handles passenger ferries, cruise ships, and ro-ro cargo, but also bulk, breakbulk, containers, and liquid bulk, and has a large fishing port.

== Communities ==
- Urbanización Playa Honda (subdivision), south

== Assets of Cultural Interest ==
The real estate properties of Arrecife registered in the Register of Assets of Cultural Interest are:

- Casa de los Arroyo
- Castillo de San Gabriel
- Castillo de San José
- Iglesia Matriz de San Ginés Obispo
- Fachada del edificio Segarra
- Headquarter of the Island Council of Lanzarote
- Salinas de Naos
- Salinas de Bufona

== Sites of interest ==
- Playa Reducto, Arrecife's town beach
- Castillo de San José, 18th-century fortress that now houses a collection of modern art
- Puente de Las Bolas, bridge leading to the Castillo de San Gabriel
- Charco de San Ginés, man-made lagoon used by fishermen

== Gallery ==
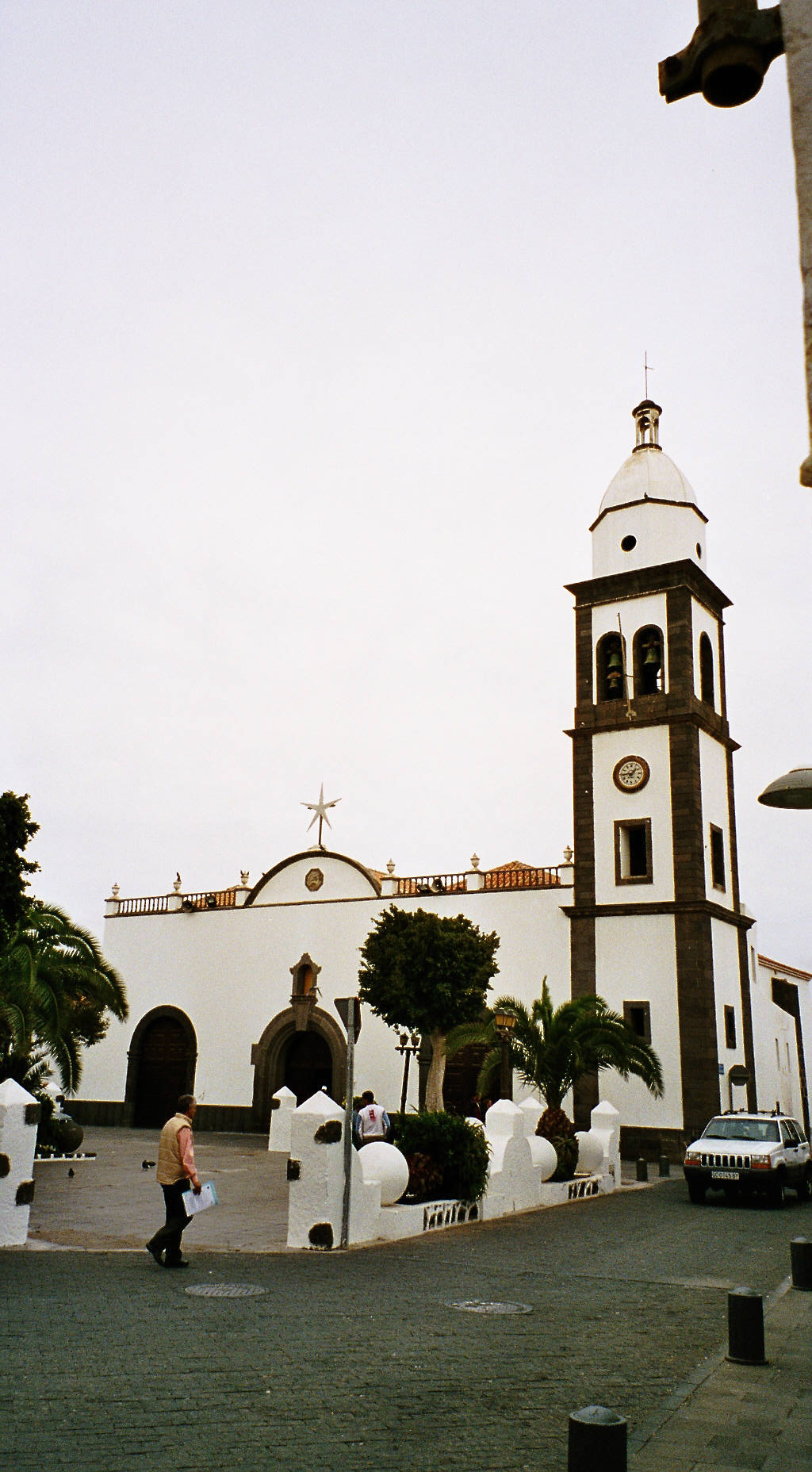
Church

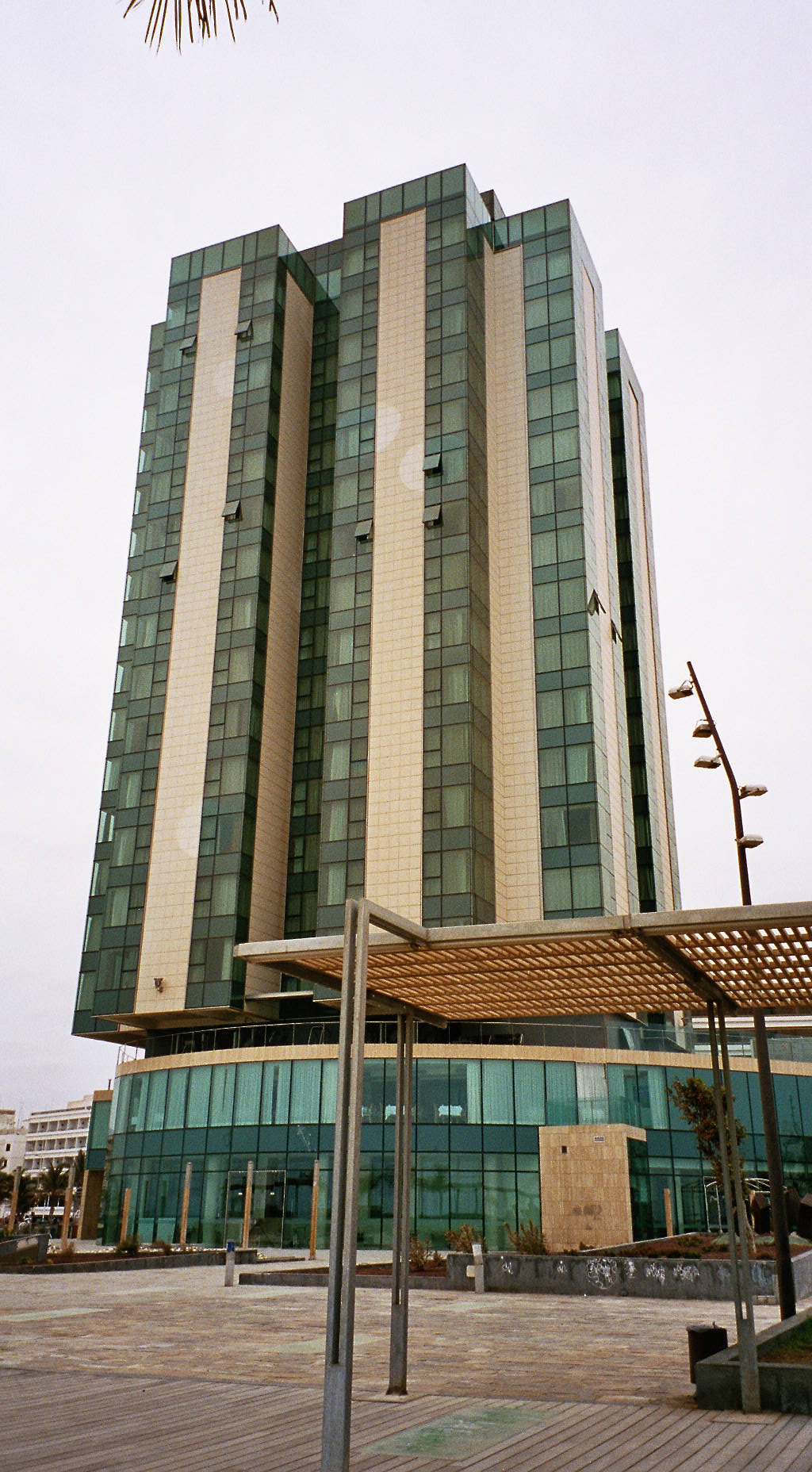
The Gran Hotel Arrecife

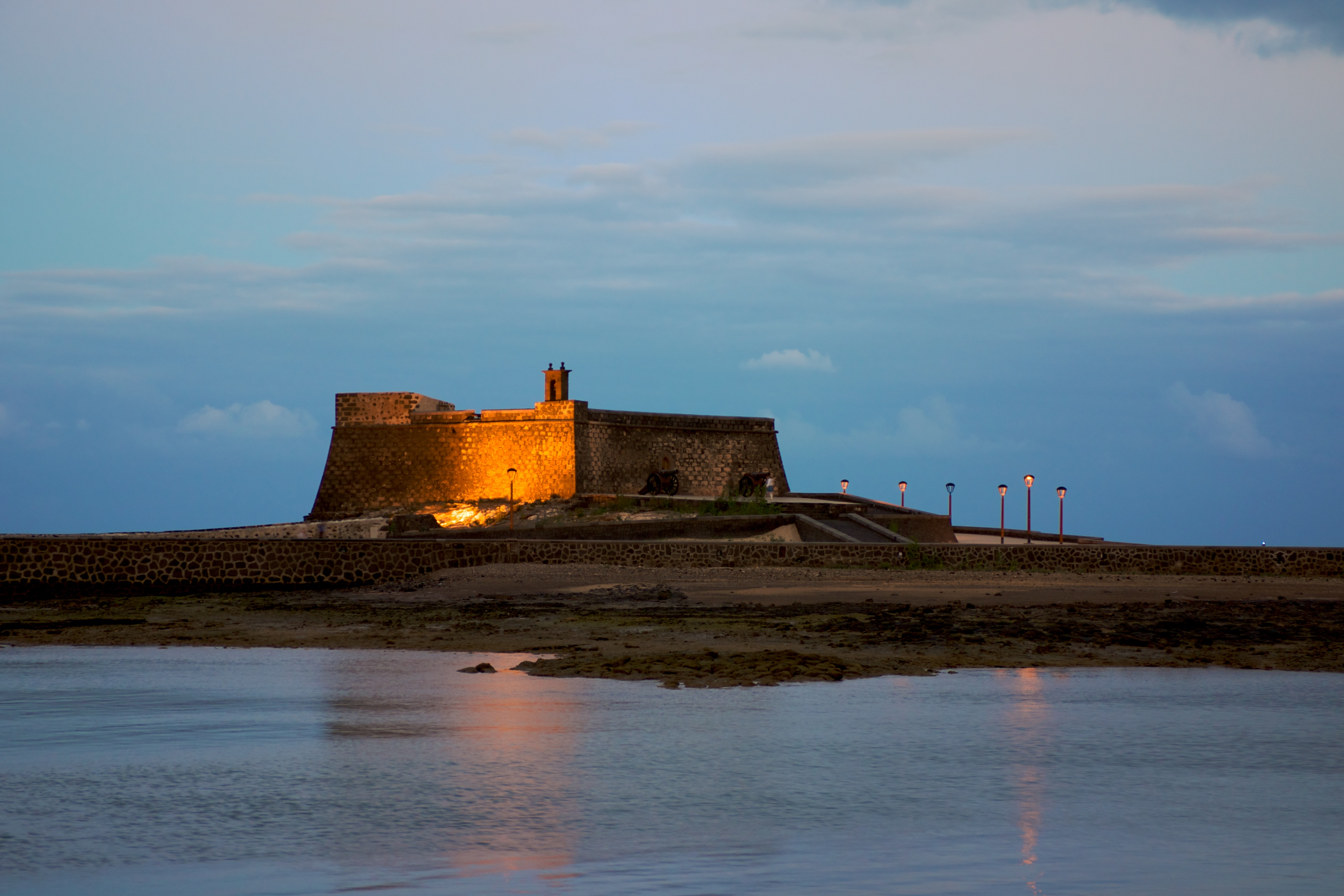
Castle of San Gabriel

== See also ==
- List of municipalities in Las Palmas
