= El Rubicon =

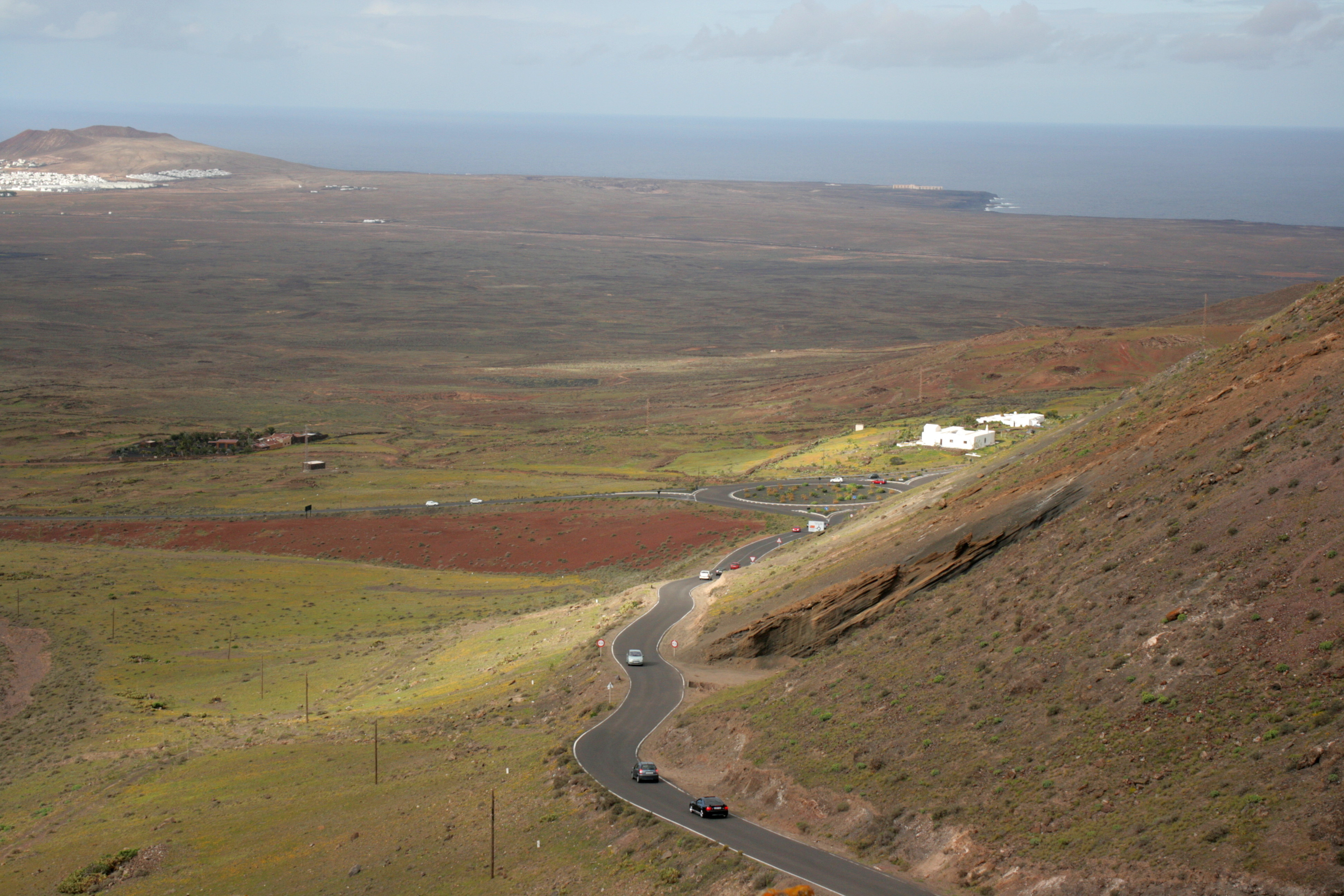
El Rubicon plain from Femes

El Rubicón is a flat gravel plain located at the southernmost end of the island of Lanzarote in the Yaiza municipality. The plain is to the south of the 'Los Ajaches' range of hills and the lava fields of Timanfaya national park.

== Etymology ==
The typonym 'El Rubicón' is derived from the Latin word 'rubicundus' (red or ruddy). This probably comes from the colour of the surrounding landscape or perhaps a specific association with Montaña Roja, a red-coloured hill in the area, formed from a dormant volcanic caldera.

== Natural Environment ==
The El Rubicón plain is an arid, environment with sparse vegetation. The area, however, is popular with birdwatchers as it attracts a broad range of species.

== Human Environment ==
In the south east of El Rubicón, one of the earliest bishoprics in the Canaries, San Marcial del Rubicón, was founded by the French adventurer, Jean de Béthencourt at the start of the fifteenth century. At San Marcial's site, near Papagayo beach, the establishment's original medieval wells can still be seen.

The southern end of El Rubicón is now dominated by the tourist resort of Playa Blanca. This ribbon development extends some nine kilometres along the coast between the 'Faro de Pechiguera' in the west to the Sandos Papagayo hotel in the east.
