= Yaiza (municipality) =

- Municipality
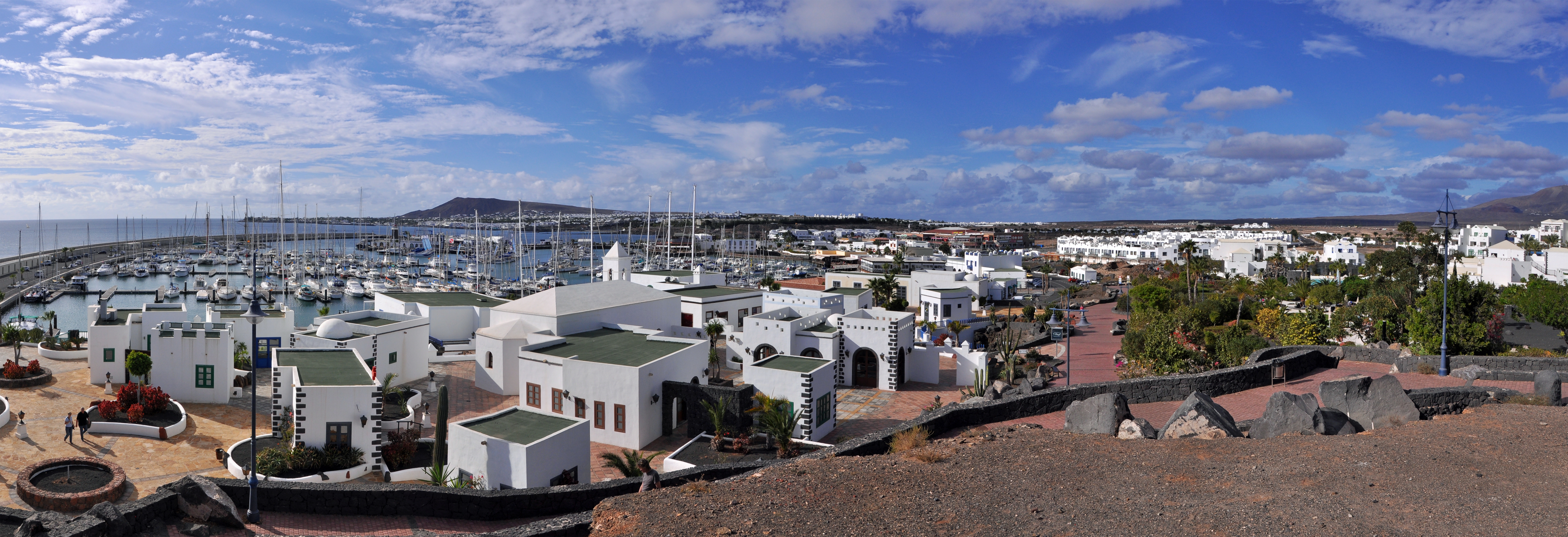
- View of Playa Blanca, Yaiza

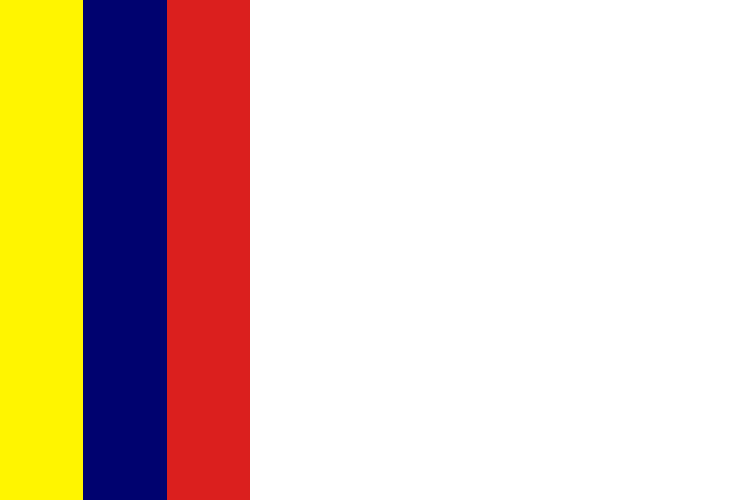
- Flag Coat of arms

- Municipal location in Lanzarote

- Location in the province of Las Palmas Yaiza (Canary Islands) Yaiza (Spain, Canary Islands)
- Coordinates: 28°56′N 13°46′W
- Country: Spain
- Autonomous Community: Canary Islands
- Province: Las Palmas
- Island: Lanzarote

Government
  - Mayor: Óscar Manuel Noda González (UPY-LAVA)

Area
  - Total: 211.85 km^{2} (81.80 sq mi)
- Elevation (AMSL): 192 m (630 ft)

Population (2025-01-01)
  - Total: 18,842
  - Density: 88.940/km^{2} (230.35/sq mi)
- Time zone: UTC±0 (WET)
  - Summer (DST): UTC+1 (WEST)
- Postal code: 35580
- Area code: +34 (Spain) + 928 (Las Palmas)
- Website: yaiza.es

Yaiza is a municipality on the island of Lanzarote in the Canary Islands, Spain. It lies in the southwest of the island and forms part of the province of Las Palmas. The municipality is bounded by the Atlantic Ocean to the west, south and east. To the north, the Timanfaya National Park is partly within the municipality. The eastern part of the municipality is mountainous and, south west of the mountains, the Rubicon plain stretches to the coast.

At the southern end of the municipality of Yaiza, in the area known as "El Rubicón", the first European settlement in the Canary Islands in 1402, where the conquest of the Archipelago began he was installed. In this place there existed the Cathedral of Saint Martial of Limoges. This cathedral was destroyed by English pirates in the sixteenth century and is currently in Femés, the Hermitage of Saint Martial of Limoges dedicated to this saint. This diocese was moved in 1483 to Las Palmas de Gran Canaria (Roman Catholic Diocese of Canarias).

The largest town of the municipality is Playa Blanca on the south coast. The administrative centre is the much smaller town of Yaiza. The total population was 16,289 in 2018, and the area is 211.85 square kilometres (81.80 sq mi). Yaiza is about 22 kilometres (14 mi) west of the island's capital, Arrecife.

== History ==
At the southern end of the municipality of Yaiza, in the area known as "El Rubicón", the first European settlement of the Canary Islands was established in 1402, from where the Conquest of the Archipelago began. In that place was the Cathedral of San Marcial de Limoges, patron saint of Lanzarote and compatron of the Canarian Diocese.1 This cathedral was destroyed by English pirates in the sixteenth century and is currently located in Femés, the Chapel of San Marcial de Limoges dedicated to this saint.

Yaiza is on the edge of the area buried by the volcanic eruptions that took place in Lanzarote between 1730 and 1736, which gave rise to the Timanfaya National Park. Precisely, the fundamental chronicle of the eruptions was narrated by the then parish priest of Yaiza, Andrés Lorenzo Curbelo.

== Sites of interest ==
- El Golfo
- Charco de los Clicos
- Los Hervideros
- Playa Blanca, beach town located in the south of the island
- Papagayo beaches
- Hacha Grande, mountain
- Puerto Calero marina

== Gallery ==
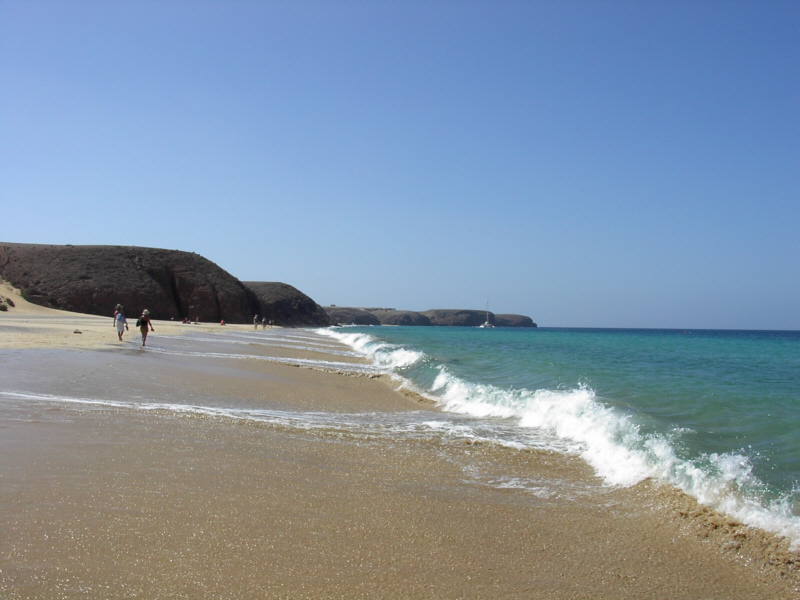
Playa de Papagayo

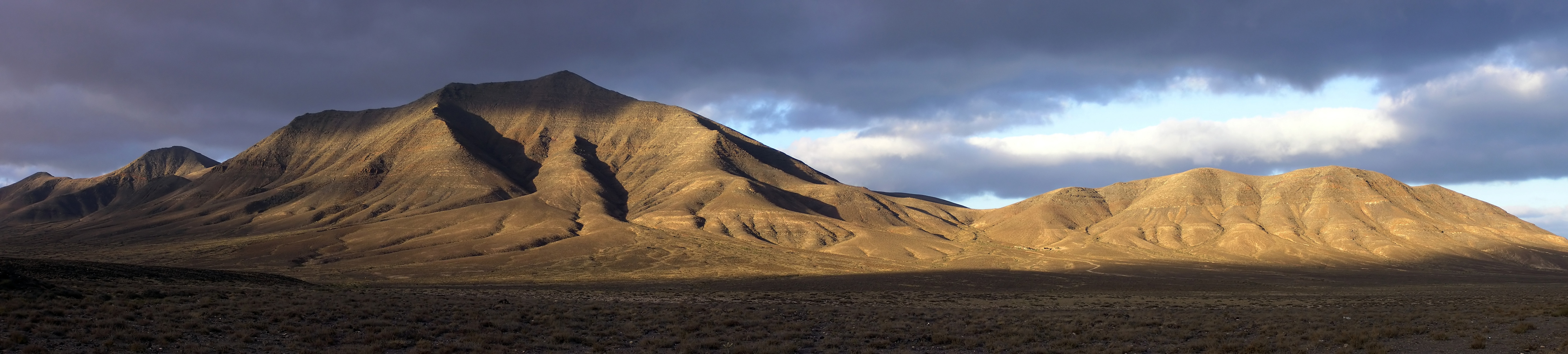
Hacha Grande, a mountain in the south of Yaiza, viewed from the road to the Playa de Papagayo

== See also ==
- List of municipalities in Las Palmas
