= Hacha Grande =

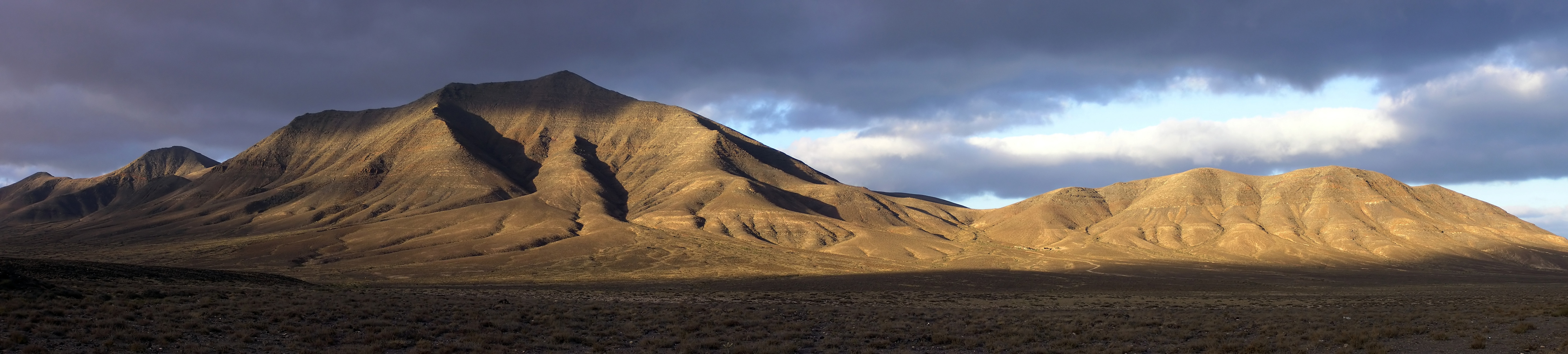
- Hacha Grande from the road to Punta de Papagayo

Highest point
- Elevation: 562 m (1,844 ft)
- Coordinates: 28°53.2′N 13°46.9′W

Naming
- English translation: Large Axe
- Language of name: Spanish

Geography
- Location: Yaiza, Lanzarote, Spain

Hacha Grande is a mountain on the Canary Island of Lanzarote, with an elevation of 562 m (1844 ft) above sea level. Its name is Spanish meaning Large Axe.

It is located in the municipality of Yaiza in the south-west of the island, near the resort of Playa Blanca and the Punta de Papagayo. The mountain makes up part of the highest mountain range on the island, Los Ajaches, which is designated a Special Protection Area (SPA) under the European Union's Birds Directive.

== Geology ==
Hacha Grande lies within the Los Ajaches massif, the oldest volcanic structure on Lanzarote. This range dates back approximately 14–15 million years, originating from an ancient shield volcano formed by extensive lava flows and pyroclastic deposits. Over time, erosive processes sculpted steep ravines and cliffs around Hacha Grande and its surroundings.

== Flora and Fauna ==
The arid, windswept slopes of Los Ajaches support specialized vegetation such as brooms and grasses adapted to minimal rainfall. The massif hosts a variety of wildlife, including kestrels, blue tits, and Majorero wall lizards. As a Special Protection Area (SPA), it's vital for bird species like vultures and hawks.

== Conservation status ==
Los Ajaches, including Hacha Grande, is protected as the "Monumento Natural de Los Ajaches" and recognized under the EU Birds Directive. The area forms a core part of Lanzarote's UNESCO biosphere reserve, highlighting both its ecological and geological significance.

== Recreation and Hiking ==
Hacha Grande is a popular hiking destination. One common route starts from the village of Femés (≈400 m elevation), ascending along unmarked trails. Experienced hikers can also begin near Playa Blanca. The round-trip can take approximately 2 hours up and 1 hour down, offering panoramic views of the ocean and, on clear days, nearby Fuerteventura

== Access and Tourism ==
Most trailheads are reached via the LZ‑702 road, which runs between Playa Blanca and Femés. While paths lack formal signage, visitors are advised to wear sturdy footwear, carry water, and remain on established trails to protect the fragile environment

Guided ecological and cultural tours of Los Ajaches are available from Playa Blanca resorts, such as Sandos Papagayo, offering insights into local biodiversity and geological history
