= Salinas de Janubio =

Salt flats in Lanzarote of the Canary Islands

Coordinates: 28°56′22″N 13°49′14″W

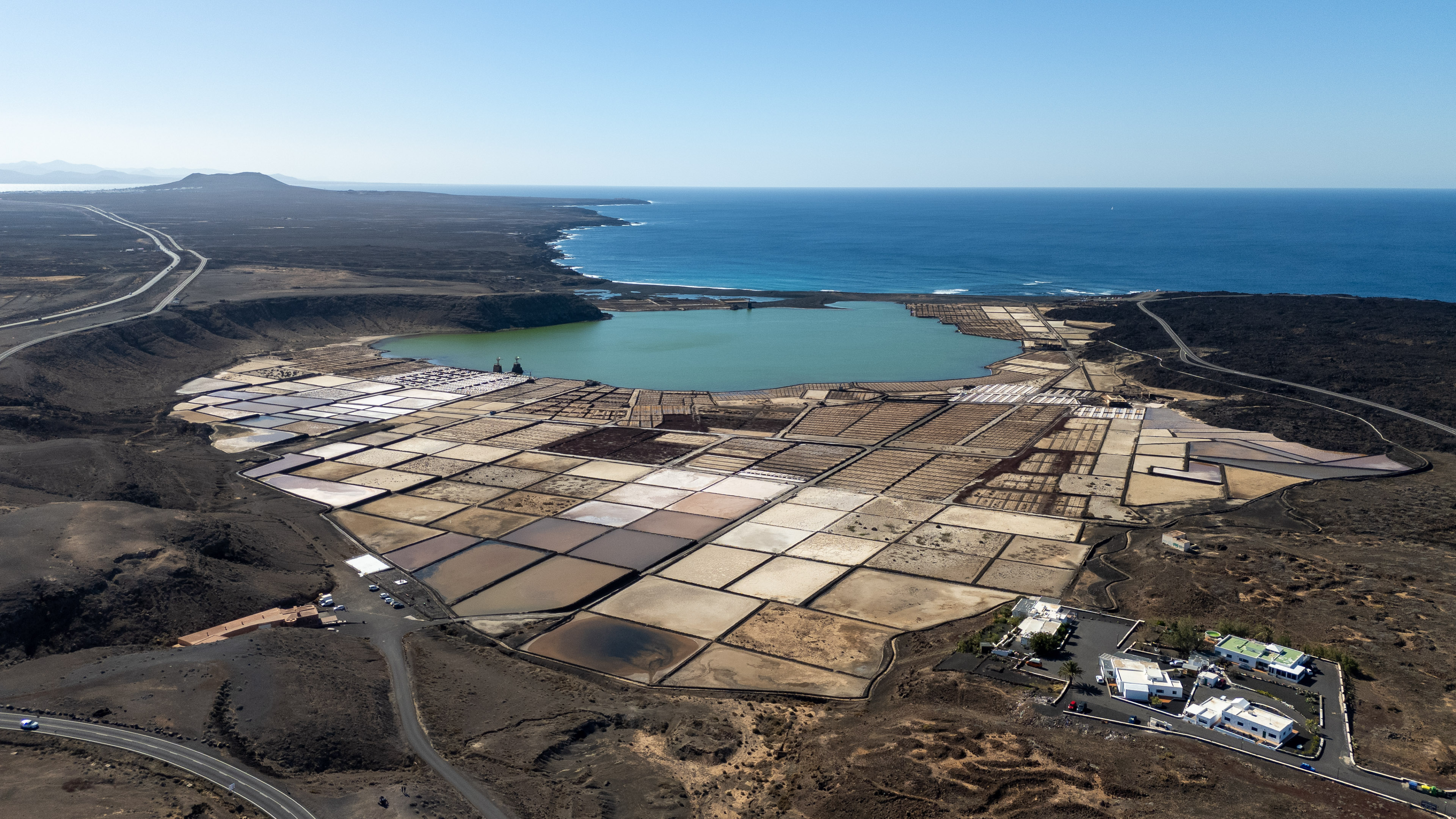
Aerial view of Salinas de Janubio in 2024

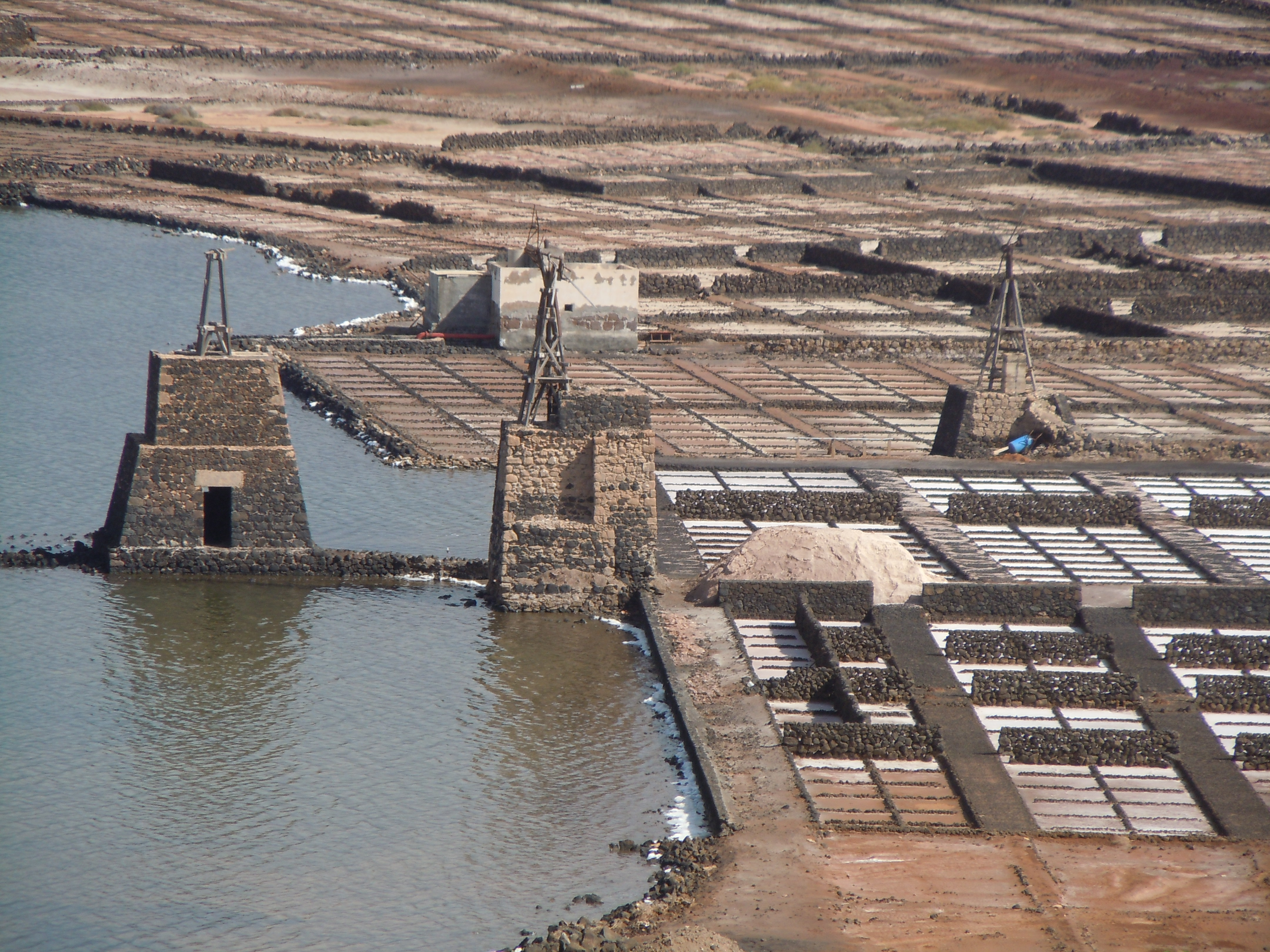
Salinas de Janubio in 2016

Salinas de Janubio are salt flats in Lanzarote of the Canary Islands. It is about 9 kilometres (5.6 mi) north of Playa Blanca. In 1730, lava from volcano eruptions formed the walls of a natural lagoon. The salt flats were first created in 1895. The waters from the natural lagoon are evaporated to yield the salt. The waters of the lagoon were originally pumped in using wind power, but now electric pumps are used. Up to 2,000-15,000 tons of salt per year can be extracted from the salt flats.

The salt that came from the salt flats has been used to preserve fish. The salt has also been used to make dyes that local artists use, especially for decorations used in the annual Corpus Christi festival.

A number of migratory birds visit the salt flats.
