= Salt evaporation pond =

Shallow artificial pond designed to extract salts from sea water or other brines,

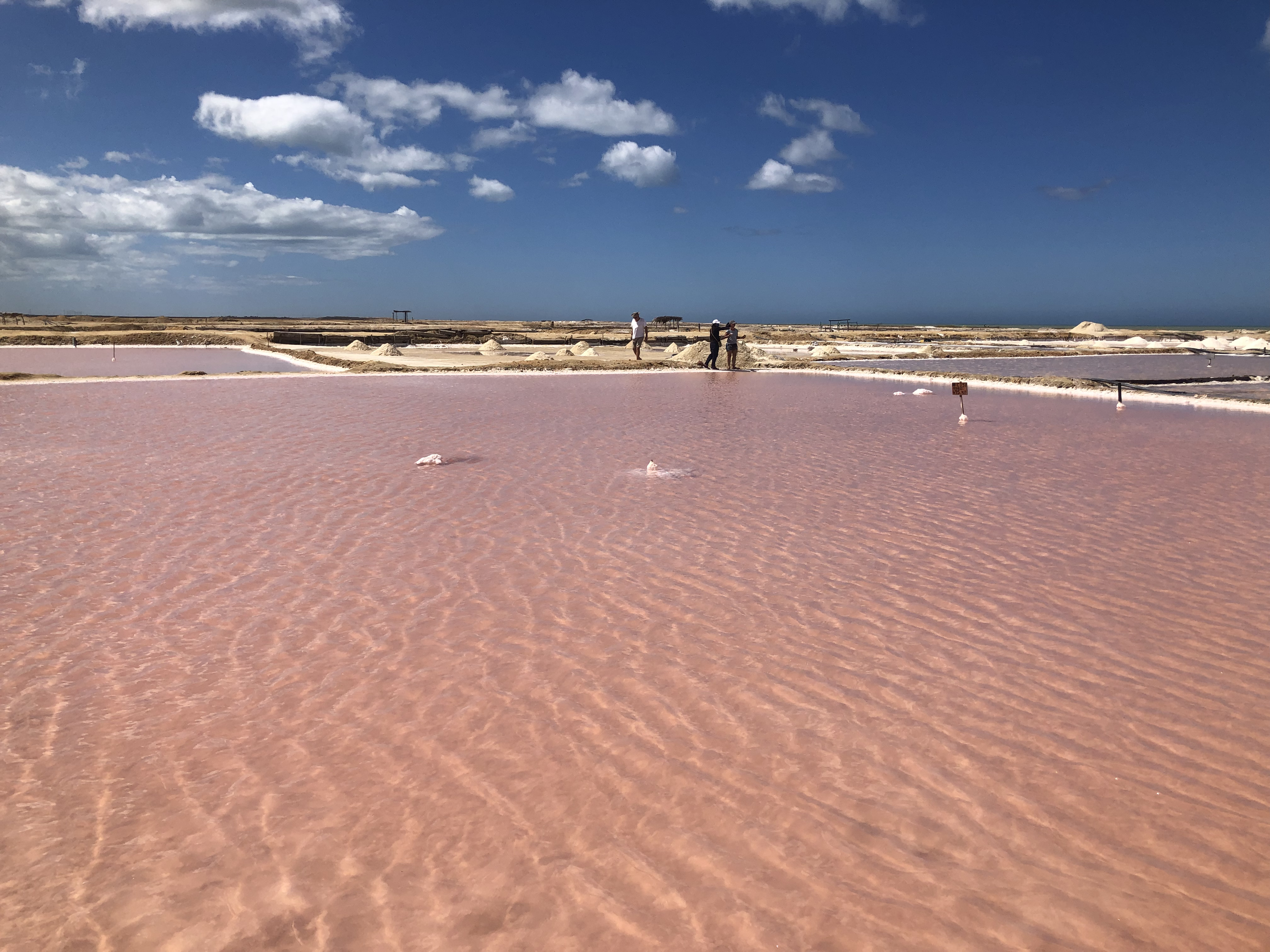
Salt evaporation pond in Manaure, La Guajira, Colombia

A salt evaporation pond is a shallow artificial salt pan designed to extract salts from sea water or other brines. The salt pans are shallow and expansive, allowing sunlight to penetrate and reach the seawater. Natural salt pans are formed through geologic processes, where evaporating water leaves behind salt deposits. Some salt evaporation ponds are only slightly modified from their natural version, such as the ponds on Great Inagua in the Bahamas, or the ponds in Jasiira, a few kilometres south of Mogadishu, where seawater is trapped and left to evaporate in the sun.

During the process of salt winning, seawater or brine is fed into artificially created ponds from which water is drawn out by evaporation, allowing the salt to be subsequently harvested.

The ponds also provide a productive resting and feeding ground for many species of waterbirds, which may include endangered species. However, Ghanaian fisheries scientist RoseEmma Mamaa Entsua-Mensah also noted that salt winning can destroy mangrove forests and mudflats, altering the environment and making it unproductive for other development or fish growth. The ponds are commonly separated by levees. Salt evaporation ponds may also be called salterns, salt works or salt pans.

== Metrics and energetics ==
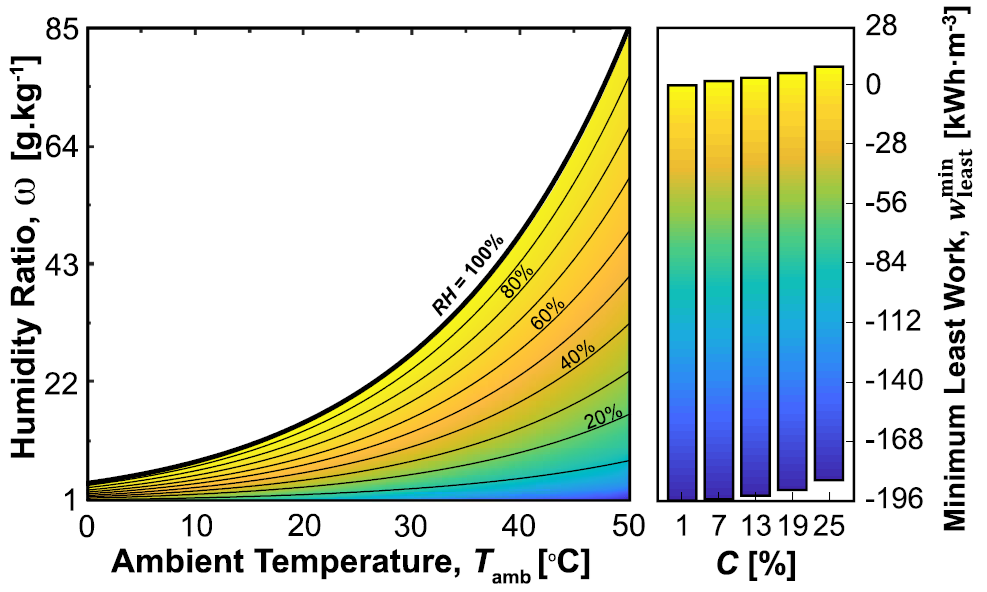
Minimum least work of evaporation from saline water to atmosphere, as a function of specific humidity (ω), temperature (T), and salinity (C, mass fraction salt).

There is an associated loss of available energy when evaporating into dry air. This Gibbs Free Energy becomes positive when the salinity is high enough (or air humid enough) for the salt solution to cause water to condense into it. That is how liquid desiccants work.

Evaporation systems are also often evaluated by the water evaporation rate per unit area. When the energy is largely provided by sunlight, these are often evaluated with a solar efficiency, ($\eta_{\rm sol}$), which is a thermal efficiency that compares incoming light energy to the enthalpy of vaporization. This is the same as the gained output ratio (GOR) in desalination.

== Algae and color ==
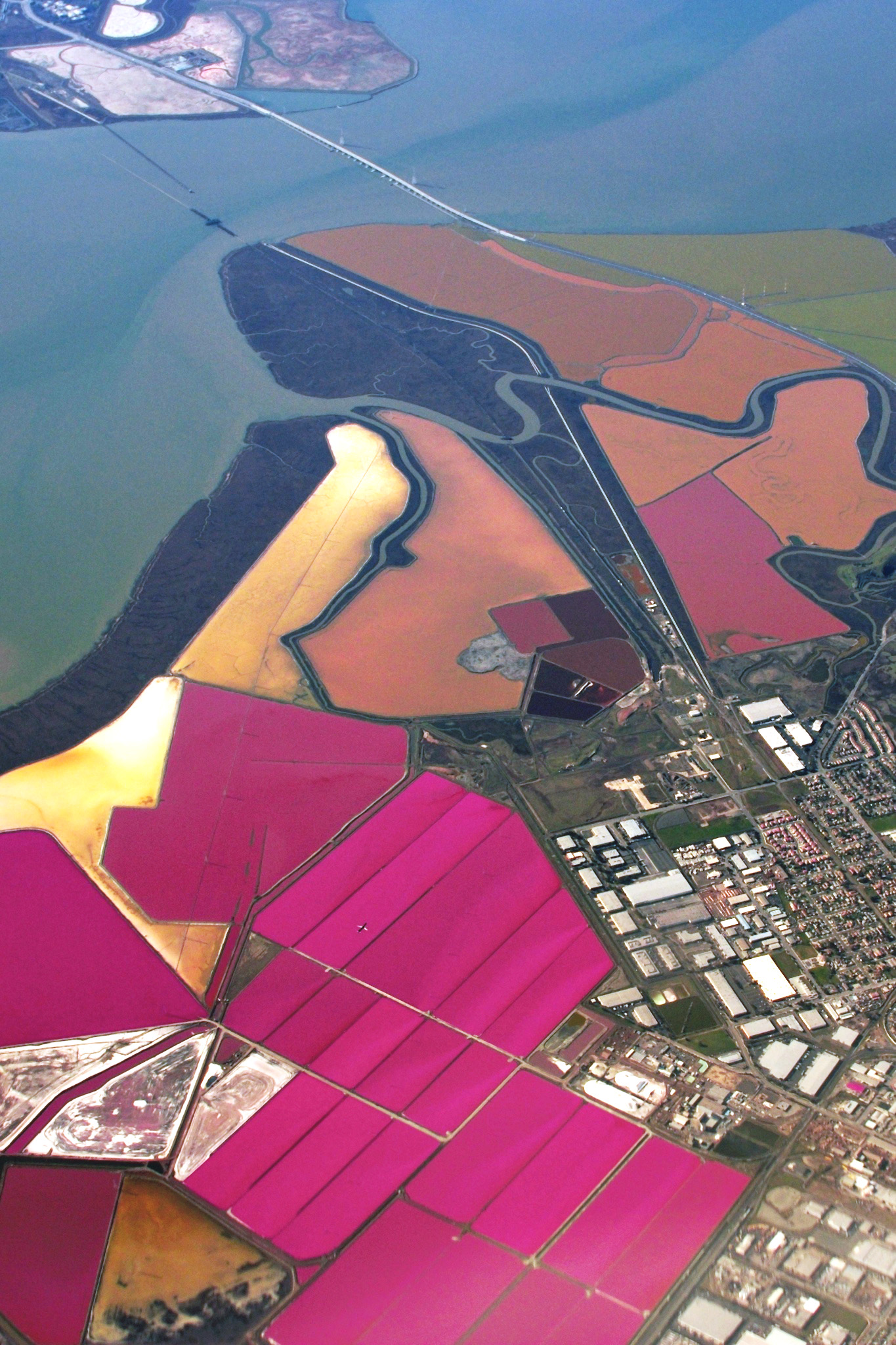
San Francisco Bay salt ponds

Due to variable algal concentrations, vivid colors (from pale green to bright red) are created in the evaporation ponds. The color indicates the salinity of the ponds. Microorganisms change their hues as the salinity of the pond increases. In low- to mid-salinity ponds, green algae such as Dunaliella salina are predominant, although these algae can also take on an orange hue. Halobacteria, a type of halophilic Archaea (also known as Haloarchaea), are responsible for changing the color of middle to high-salinity ponds to shades of pink, red, and orange. Other bacteria such as Stichococcus also contribute tints.

== Examples ==
Notable salt ponds include:

- The Salterns of Guérande, in Loire-Atlantique, France. The salt produced in the salterns are a protected geographical indication in Europe.
- The Cáhuil salt ponds, in the O'Higgins Region, Chile.
- The Manaure salt ponds, in La Guajira Department, Colombia.
- The Salineras de Maras, Peru, in the Cusco Region.
- The saltworks of Alcácer do Sal, Comporta, and Castro Marim in Portugal
- The El Caracol solar evaporator, on the outskirts of Mexico City, Mexico.
- The Sečovlje and Strunjan salt ponds on the northern edge of the Adriatic Sea in Slovenia.
- The San Francisco Bay salt ponds in the United States, formerly operated by Cargill, including Charleston Slough. Cargill has since ended salt production in the area, and most of the ponds are being restored to a more natural state.
- South Bay Salt Works in San Diego, California.
- The Dead Sea salt ponds in the West Bank, Israel and Jordan.
- The salt ponds in Salina, Malta. The name of the village is the Maltese word for salt pan.
- The Port Hedland, Dampier, Lake McLeod, Useless Loop and Onslow salt ponds in Western Australia.
- Yellow Walls, Malahide, Ireland; active from 1770 to 1837.
- Lake Grassmere in New Zealand
- The ancient salt pans in Marsala and Trapani, Sicily. Salt has been farmed here since the Phoenician period, with archaeological evidence still present in nearby Motya.
- The Nature reserve of Margherita di Savoia, in Apulia, Italy. Known since antiquity, it's one of the largest in Europe. Flamingos often nest in the area.
- The salt works on the island of Great Inagua owned by Morton Salt.
- The salt harvesting by the Tsonga women of Baleni on the Small Letaba River, Limpopo, South Africa.

Until World War II, salt was extracted from sea water in a unique way in Egypt near Alexandria. Posts were set out on the salt pans and covered with several feet of sea water. In time the sea water evaporated, leaving the salt behind on the post, where it was easier to harvest.

== Production ==
Salt pans are shallow and open, and metal pans are often used to evaporate brine. They are usually found close to the source of the salt. For example, pans used in the solar evaporation of salt from seawater are usually found on the coast, while those used to extract salt from solution-mined brine will be found near the brine shaft. In this case, extra heat is often provided by lighting fires underneath.

== History ==
=== Archaeology ===
Archaeology is difficult and fragmentary: sea-level rise, deliberate demolition of furnaces, and repeated breakage of containers obscure direct traces.

==== In Europe ====
Archaeological evidence indicates that early European salt making (from the Neolithic through the Iron Age) relied mainly on inland brine sources and fuel-evaporation techniques (briquetage), with production systems adapted to local environments; large coastal solar ponds were best suited to warmer, arid regions.

Evidence for marine salt making in western Europe reaches back to the 5th millennium BCE, where seasonal coastal lagoons behind low sandy–silty shores likely served as proto-salterns that pre-concentrated brine before heating.

By the 3rd millennium BCE in France's Centre-Ouest, the hypothesis of organized salt production is validated archaeologically, with distinctive ceramic forms signalling brine-heating installations; this does not exclude prior solar concentration in littoral lagoons such as Locmariaquer/Carnac (Morbihan) and Varna (Bulgaria).

==== In China ====
In China, archaeological and chemical analyses at Zhongba (Three Gorges) demonstrate significant salt production by the first millennium BCE, with indications of earlier activity and brine-boiling as a primary technique.

On the north China coast (southern Laizhou Bay, Shandong), late Neolithic through Shang–Zhou saltmaking sites (e.g., Shuangwangcheng, Nanheya) show sea-salt manufacture adapted to coastal flooding and Holocene shoreline change. Multi-proxy evidence further reconstructs prehistoric sea-salt manufacture on the East China coast as an adaptation strategy to coastal flooding.

==== In India ====
In India, coastal settlements on the Saurashtra–Gulf of Khambhat littoral show direct archaeological evidence for sea-salt manufacture: the Harappan site of Padri (Kerala-no-dhoro) is interpreted as a specialised salt-producing centre in the Mature Harappan period (ca. 2200–2000 BCE). A geoarchaeological synthesis notes that Padri's economy “depended on salt manufacturing” in a stable estuarine setting close to present sea level.

==== In Mesopotamia and Sumer ====
In Mesopotamia (including Sumer), cuneiform sources attest salt as Sumerian mun (sign MUN) and Akkadian milḫu (salt). Procurement drew mainly on natural salines and brines of the alluvial plain and marshlands; the direct archaeological visibility of purpose-built evaporation complexes is limited.

==== In America ====
At El Salado (central Veracruz), salt production shows two major occupational phases: an Early Formative phase (ca. 1400–1000 BCE) and a Late Classic phase (ca. AD 650–1000), identified through stratified features and residues associated with brine evaporation and salt making.

=== Marine salterns in antiquity ===
Across the classical civilizations of the Mediterranean, the ancient Middle East, India and Han China, antiquity transformed salt use less through new technology than through administration and literacy: conservative production know-how persisted while political (west) and bureaucratic (east) management, enabled by classical literate elites, widened output, distribution and consumption.

Within this framework, marine salterns took on greater importance: sea-salt exploitation expanded, waterborne transport increasingly displaced overland routes, and by about AD 500 sea salt supplied the larger share of salt consumption—no longer a luxury but a staple closely tied to fish processing.

By classical antiquity, extensive marine salterns (salinae) operated around the Mediterranean. Seawater was channelled by gravity into connected, shallow evaporation ponds where brine concentration increased stepwise before crystallisation and harvest.

Sea-salt production in antiquity was fundamental to food preservation, animal husbandry and crafts, yet the archaeological footprint of the salt pans (salinae) themselves is comparatively scarce, making the reconstruction of production landscapes and practices challenging.

Across the ancient Near East—including Phoenicia, Egypt, Mesopotamia and Israel—salt held ritual, symbolic and legal significance: it was prescribed for offerings at the Jerusalem Temple; invoked in “covenants of salt” and other treaty formulae; used to curse conquered lands by salting the soil; and, in the Second Temple period, supplied to the Temple as a tax-free ration by imperial rulers. Rabbinic texts describe substantial salt usage and a dedicated storehouse for Temple sacrifices, while early Christian writings employ salt as a moral metaphor (“salt of the earth”; speech “seasoned with salt”). Some traditions also linked salt to fertility and to Aphrodite.

Where conditions allowed, salt-evaporation ponds were laid out in sheltered coastal lagoons and low-energy shorelines, using networks of shallow, graded basins linked by canals and sluices to concentrate seawater by solar evaporation before crystallization and harvest.

On the Tyrrhenian seaboard, including the environs of the Tiber mouth, exploitation of lagoonal wetlands provided early, enduring settings for salt making within broader coastal economies and transport systems.

Documented Roman salterns include complexes at O Areal (Vigo, NW Iberia), Kaunos (southern Turkey), and the lagoonal systems near Maccarese–Fiumicino (Rome), which preserve characteristic arrays of ponds, channels and working surfaces for marine salt production.

Along Israel's Mediterranean coast, particularly the Western Galilee and northern Carmel, surveys by the Israel Antiquities Authority have recorded ancient salt-producing installations, including sequences of shallow evaporation basins and channels.

From the late Republic through the first two centuries CE, ownership and management were diverse: some salinae were state property leased out to tax-farming companies, but many were run under municipal or private control; a universal state monopoly is not supported by the available evidence.

In Oceania, archaeologically attested solar-evaporation salterns are documented at the Sigatoka Sand Dunes (Viti Levu, Fiji), where seventh-century AD installations used large flanged clay dishes to evaporate seawater—the first prehistoric salt-working identified in the Pacific. Salt pans have also been constructed in the Hawaiian Islands, famously in Kawaihae west of Hawaiʻi island.

=== Marine salterns in middle-age ===
On the French Atlantic seaboard (Guérande–Batz, the Baie de Bourgneuf/Marais breton, and Saintonge/Brouage), purpose-built solar saltern landscapes took shape from the early Middle Ages.

In the Guérande basin, marsh-based pond systems are securely attested by the 9th century (with earlier know-how) and became the dominant mode of production.

In Saintonge/Brouage, sheltered lagoonal settings were engineered into étier-fed, graded ponds. Late-medieval documents—Blanchet family accounts (1463–1512) in the Bourgneuf area—detail ownership, restructuring and renewed exploitation after mid-14th-century disruption. The 1478 rent survey for the prévôté d’Hiers records renewed exploitation and organisation in the Saintonge marshes.

Studies of distribution and river/coastal routes show Atlantic “bay salt” circulating widely from Merovingian/Carolingian times toward northern France and the British Isles.

Outside France, medieval salterns are widely attested: in England, the Domesday Book (1086) records over 1,195 “salinae,” mostly on the south and east coasts. In Portugal, a 959 donation charter by Countess Mumadona Dias mentions lands “in Alavario et salinas” at Aveiro, indicating early-medieval salt pans on the Ria de Aveiro.

=== From early modern reorganization to industrialization ===
After the Middle Ages, European saltmaking saw both the expansion of coastal solar salterns and the rationalization of inland brine works. In the northern Adriatic, the Piran/Sečovlje system was reorganised under Venetian rule (regular sequences of evaporation and crystallisation basins) and, during a 15th-century wave of salt-pan destructions elsewhere, Piran's pans remained active and entered a prolonged “golden age.”

== Gallery ==
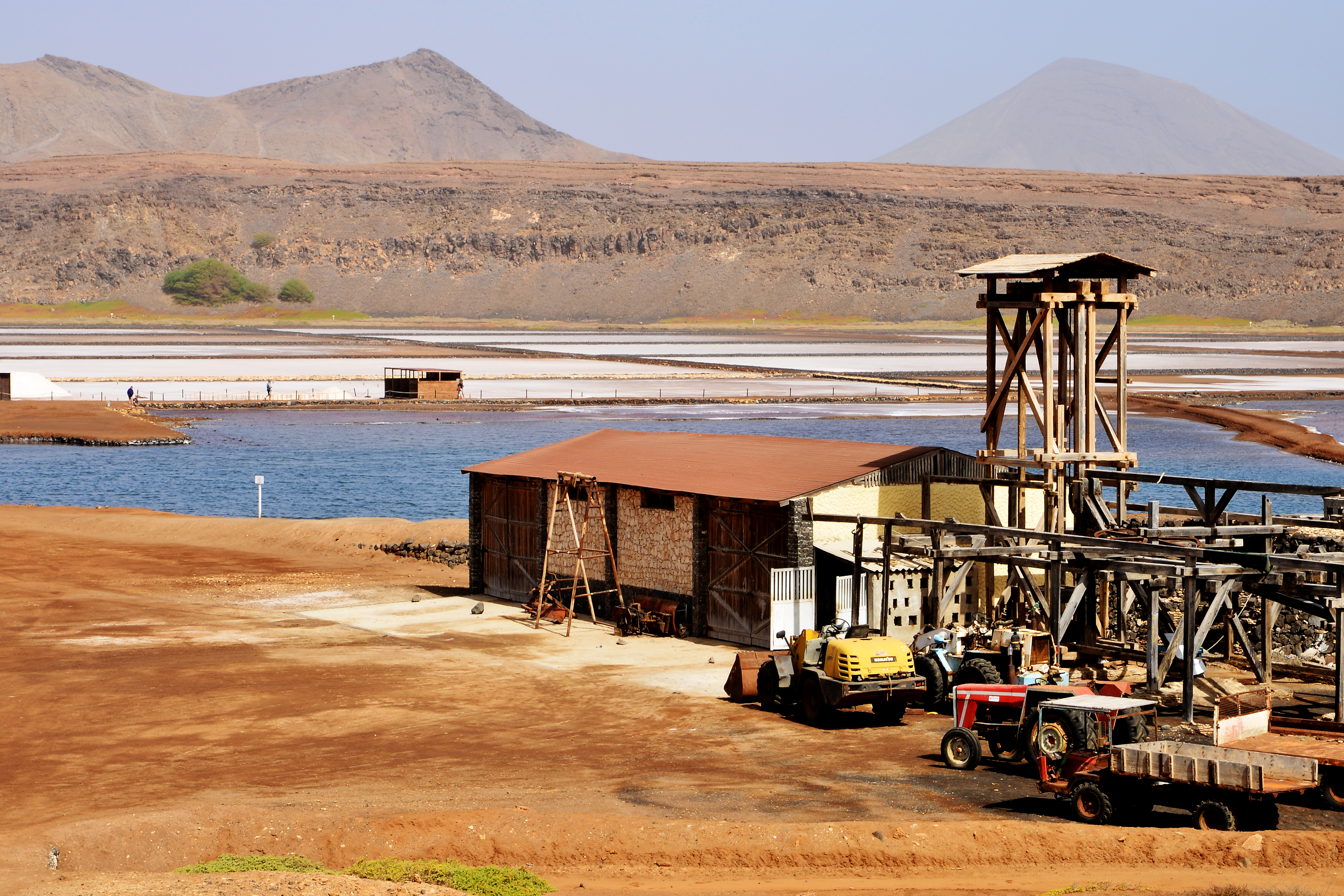
Natural salt evaporation ponds at Pedra de Lume, Sal island, Cape Verde

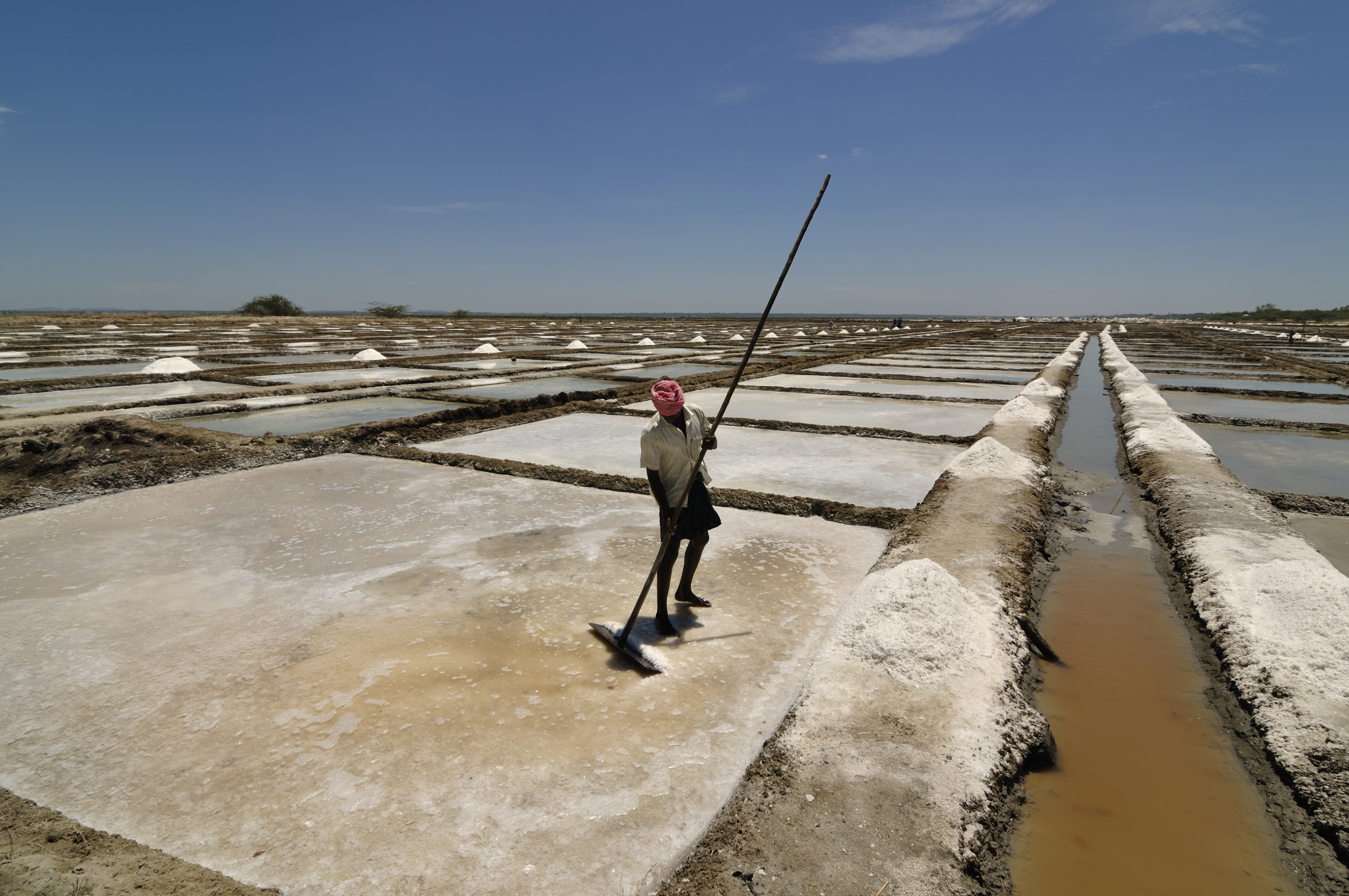
A salt pan worker in a salt evaporation pond in Tamil Nadu, India.

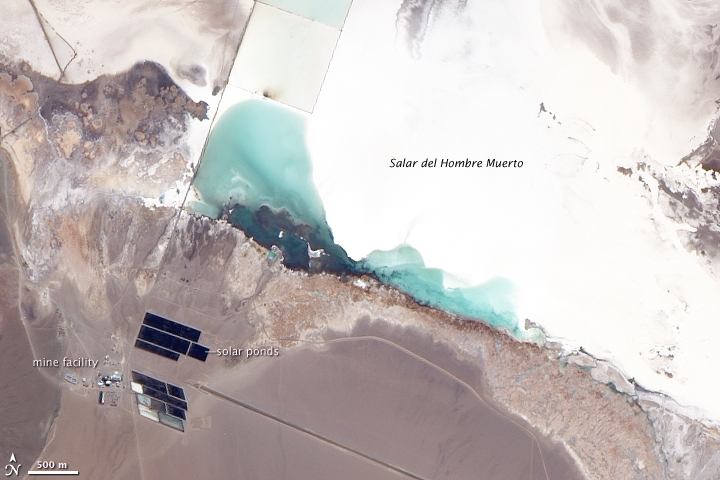
Salt evaporation ponds at a lithium mine in Argentina. The brine in this salar is rich in lithium, and the mine concentrates the brine in the ponds.

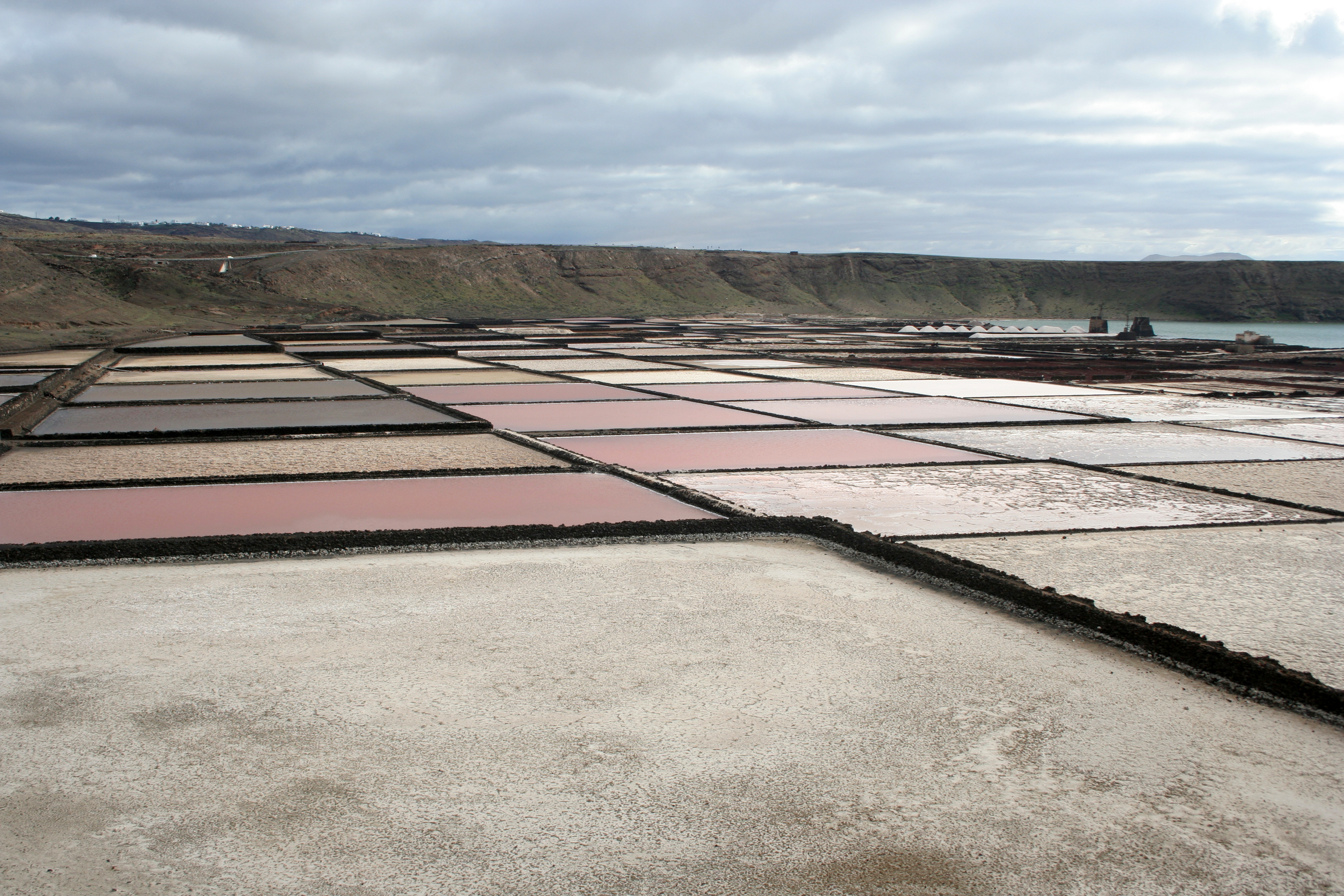
Contemporary solar evaporation salt pans on the island of Lanzarote at Salinas de Janubio

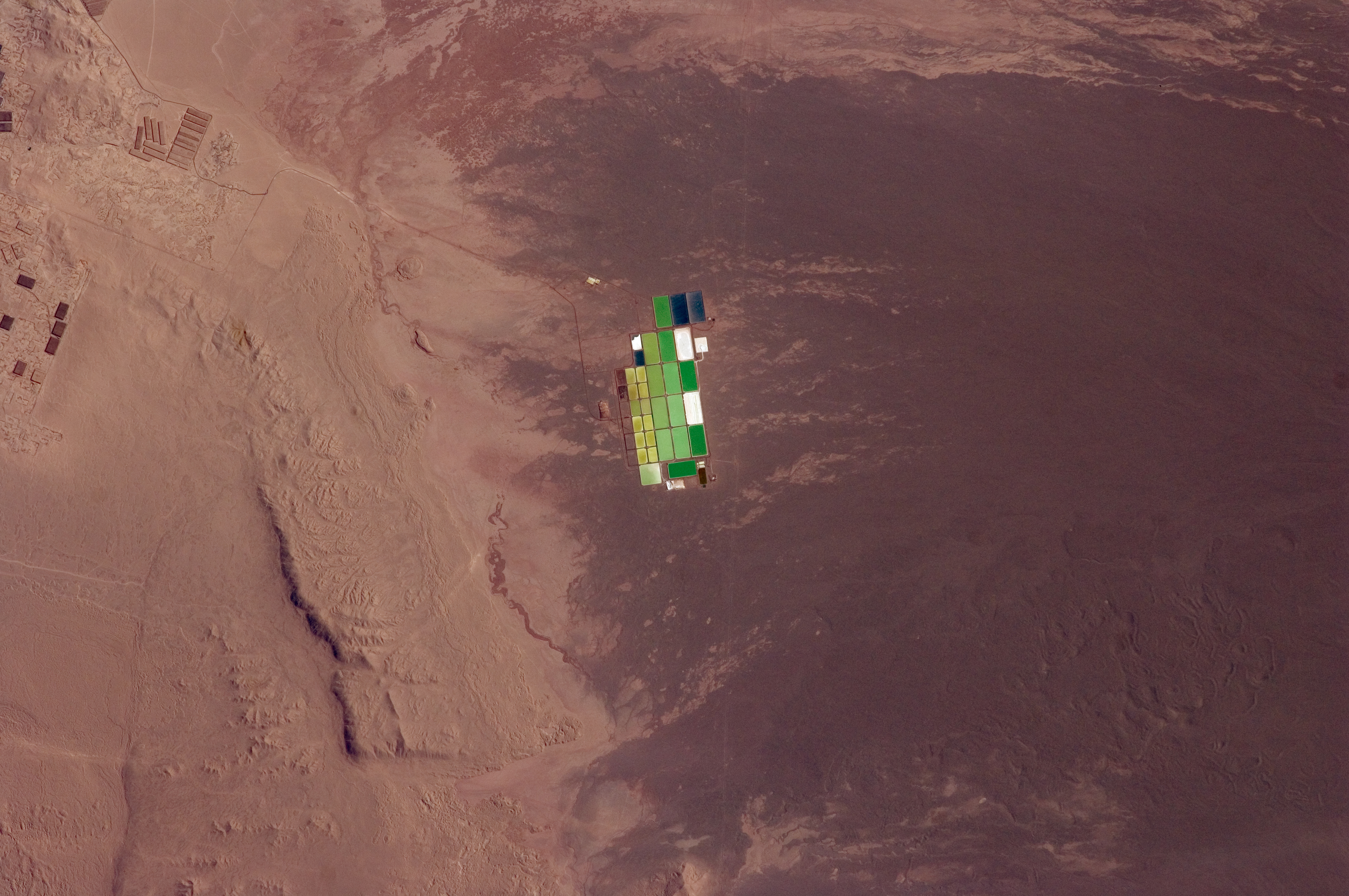
Solar evaporation ponds in the Atacama Desert

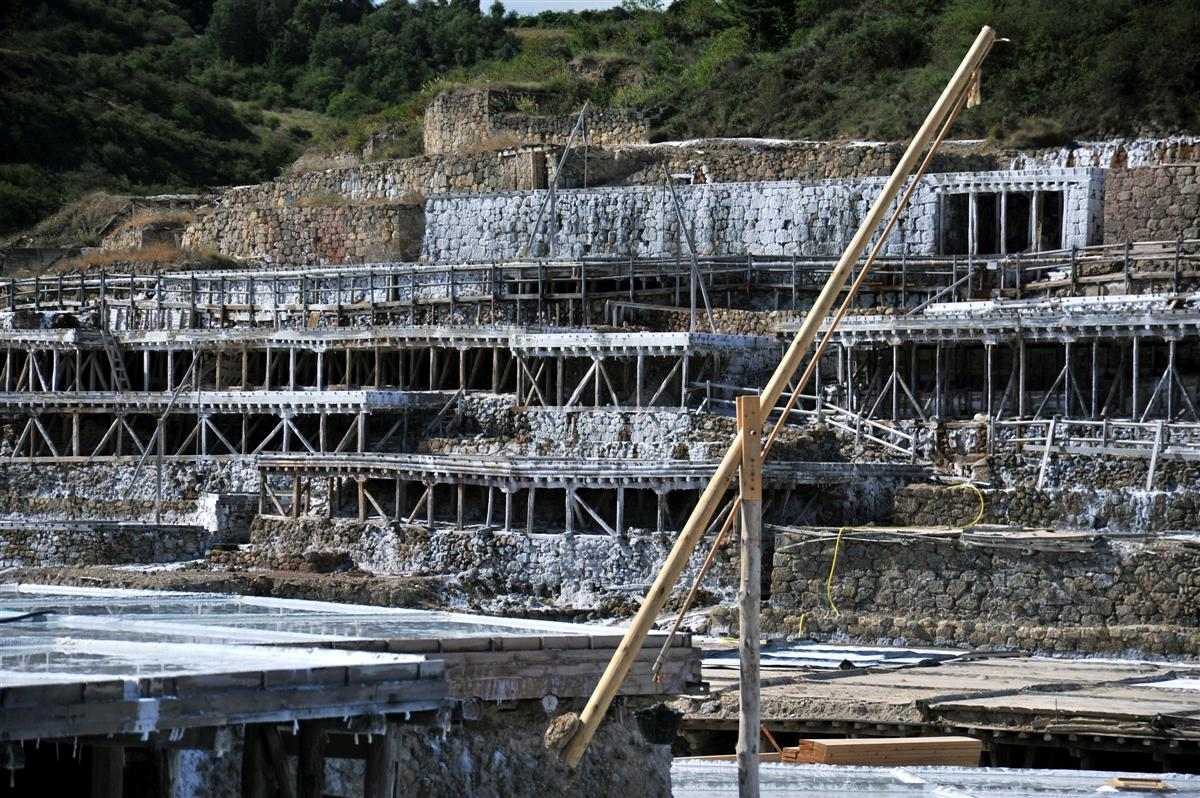
Solar evaporation ponds in the Salt Valley of Añana, Spain

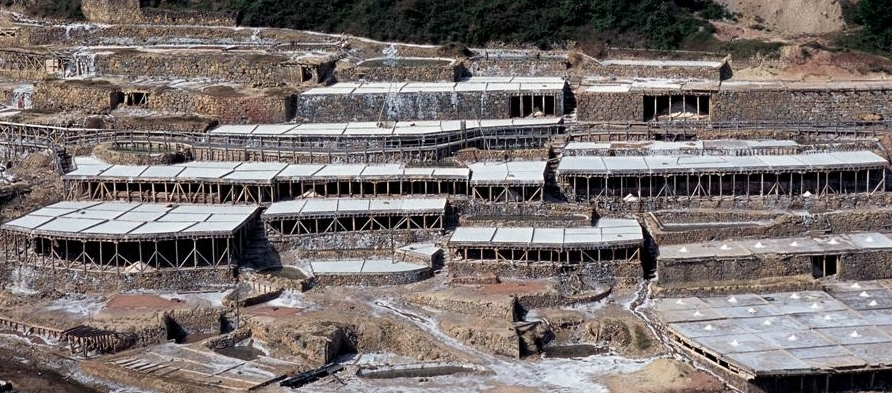
Solar evaporation ponds in the Salt Valley of Añana, Spain

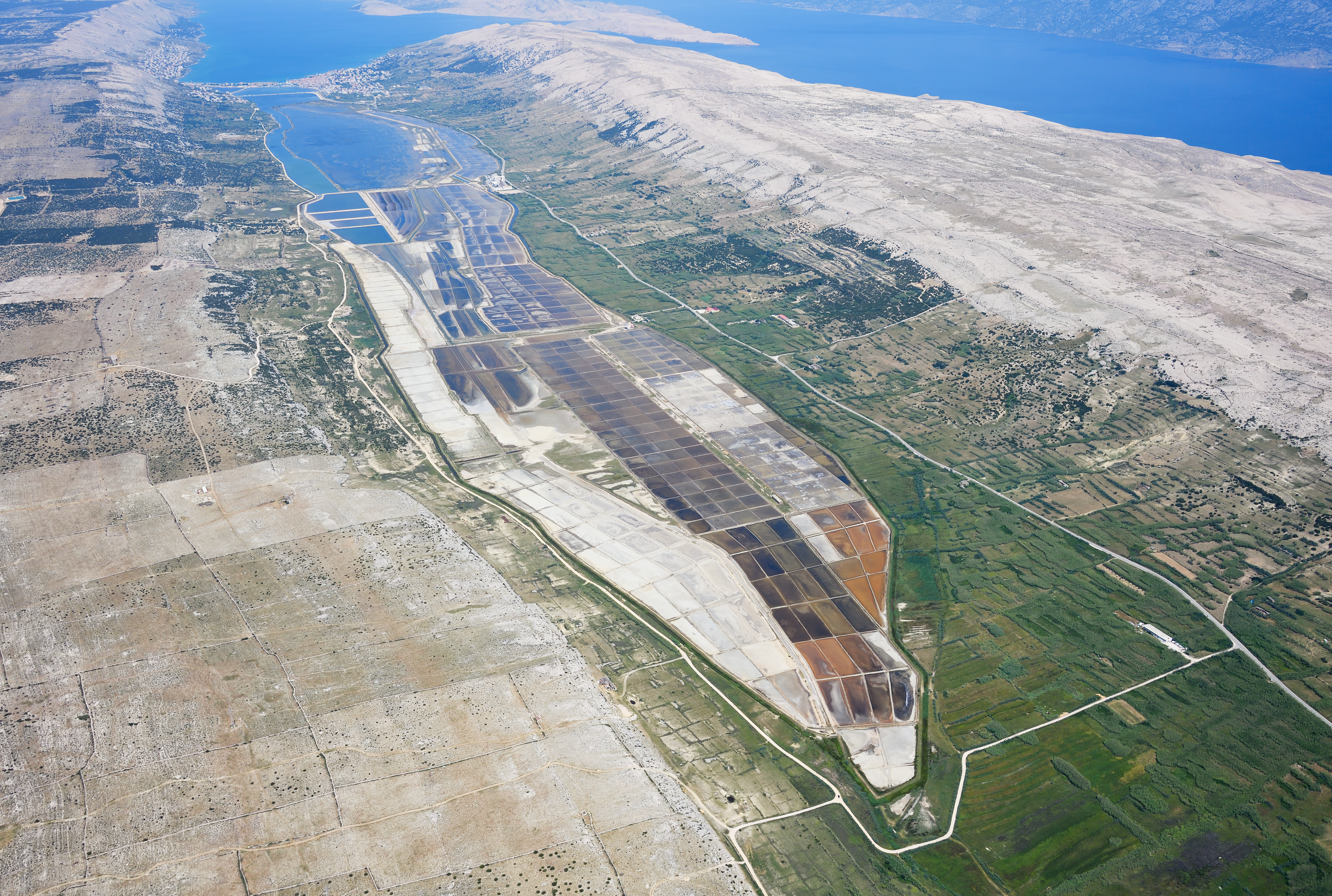
Salt evaporation ponds at Pag, Croatia

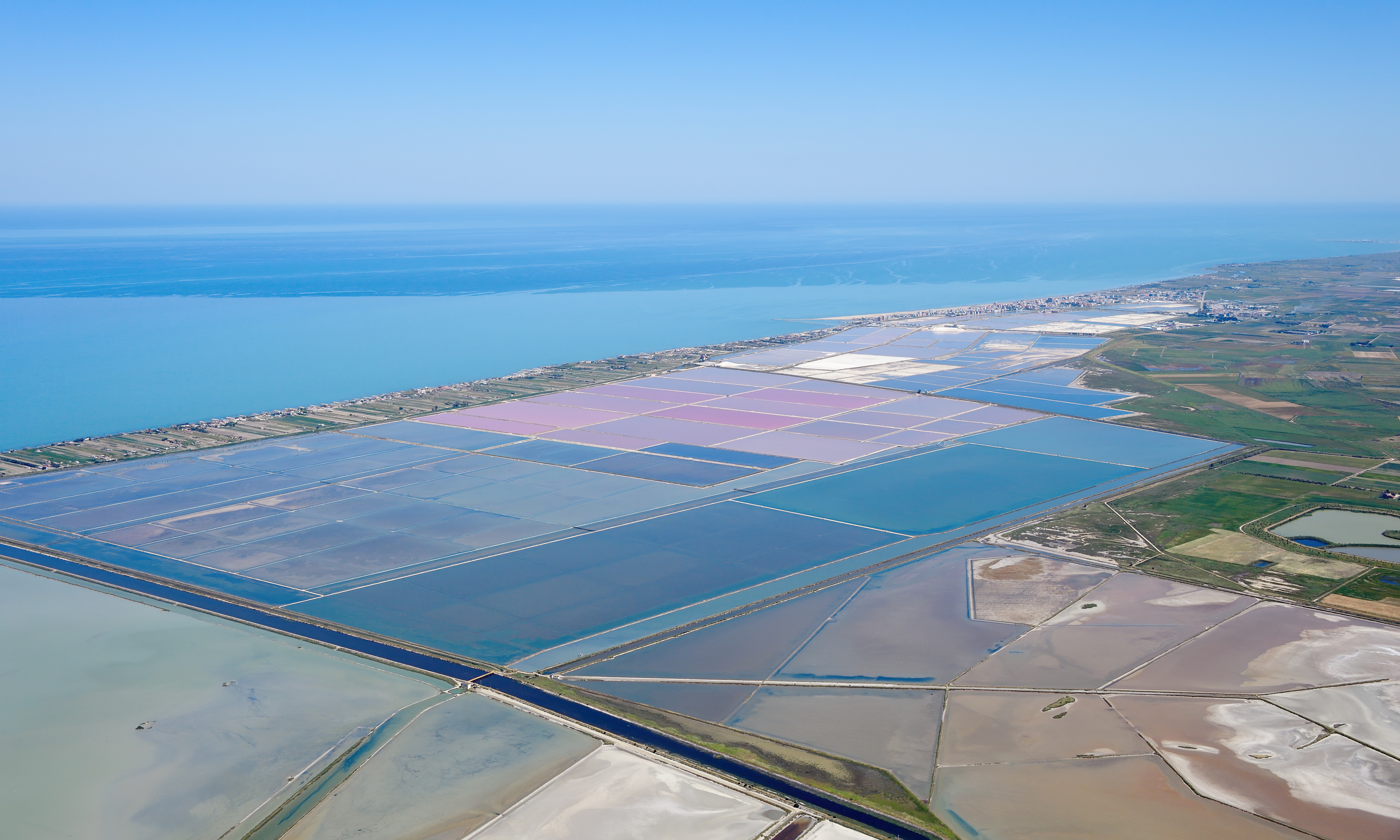
Aerial view of the Saline di Margherita di Savoia, Italy

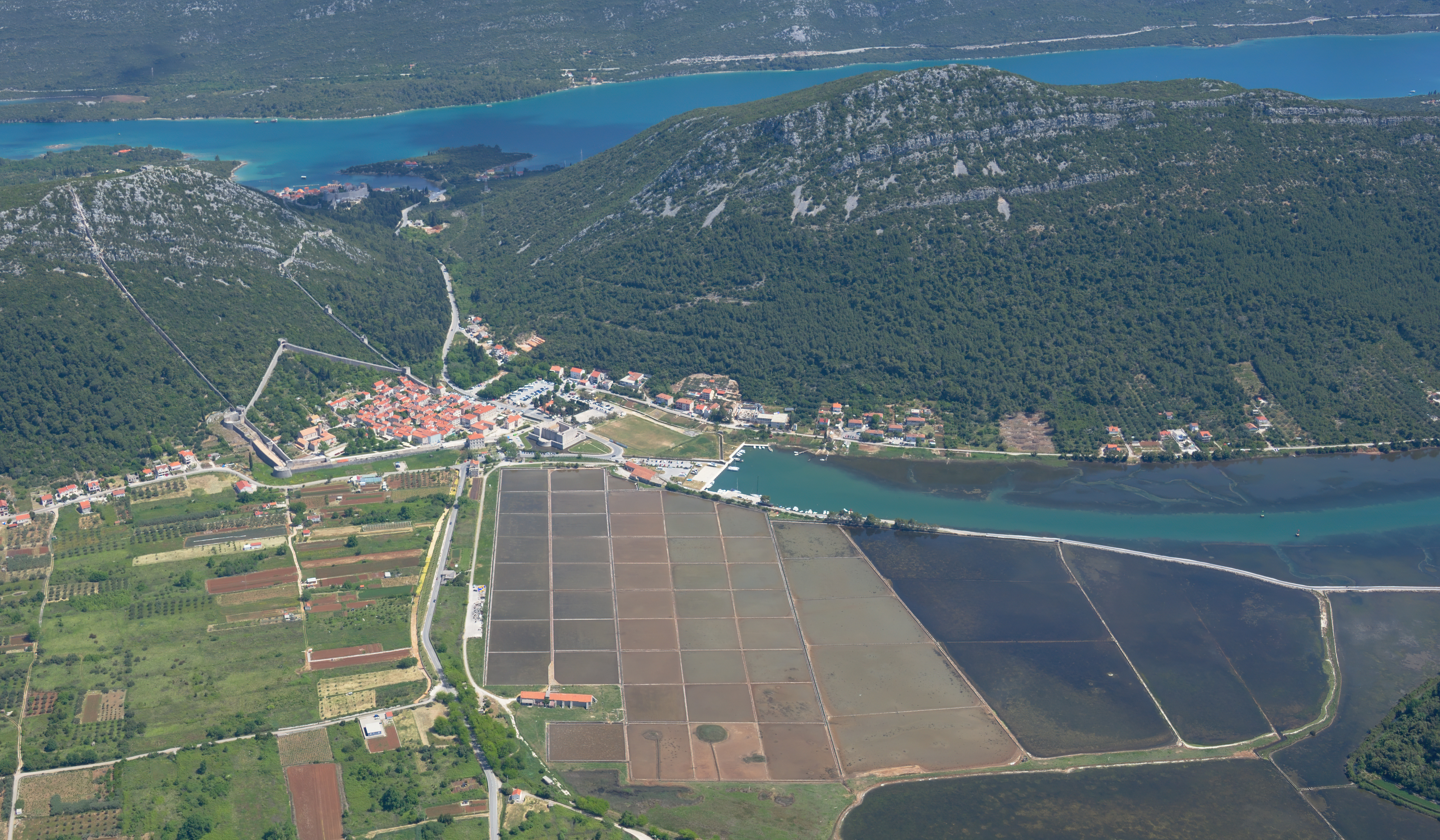
Aerial view of the salt evaporation ponds in Ston, Croatia

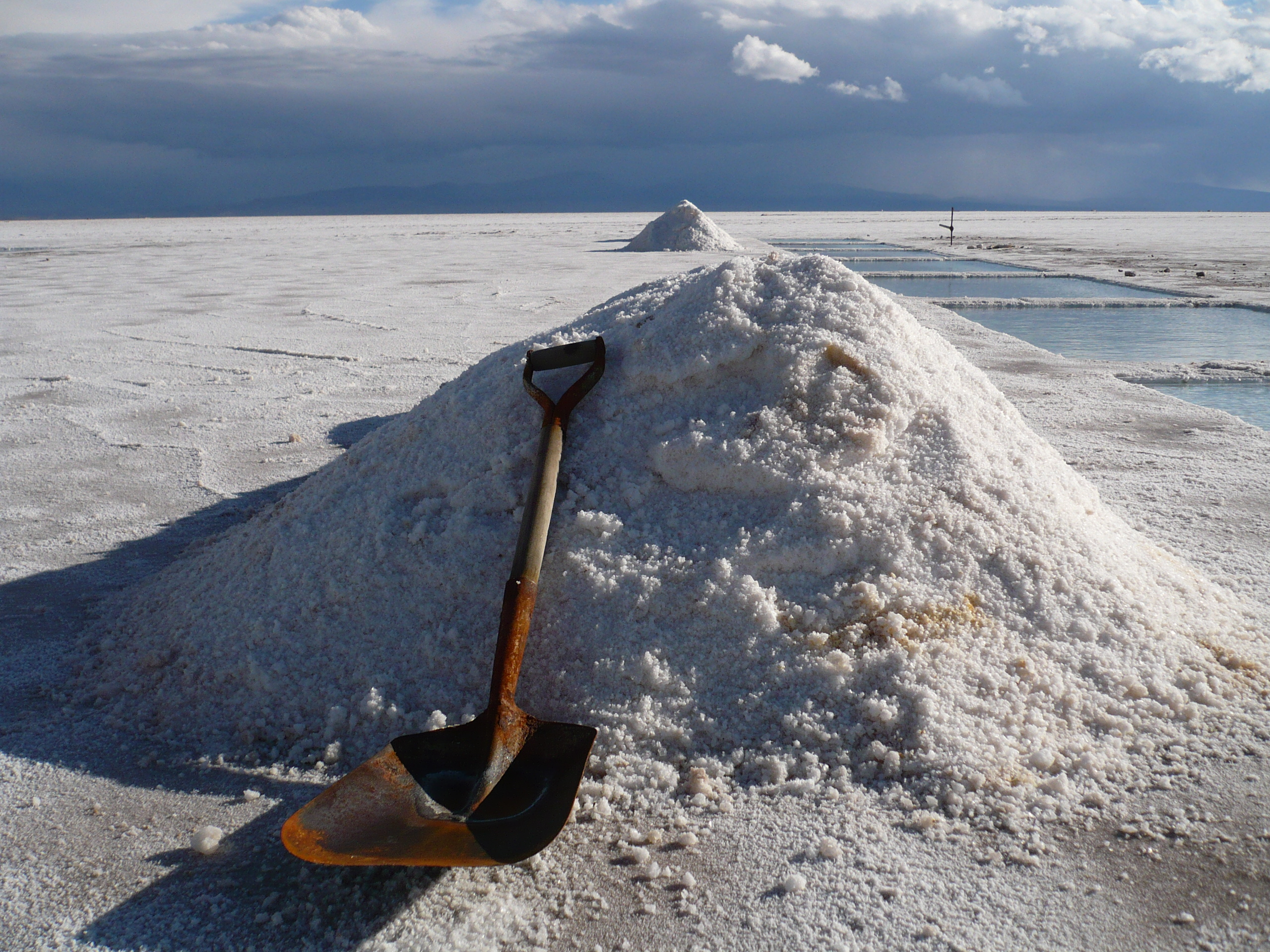
Salt pile in Argentina

== See also ==
- Solar desalination
- Seawater greenhouse
- Evaporite

== Video ==
- Short BBC documentary on the salt evaporation ponds of Pedra de Lume, Cape Verde
