= Playa Blanca =

- Town
- Location within Lanzarote Location within Canary Islands
- Coordinates: 28°51′54″N 13°49′50″W
- Country: Spain
- Autonomous Community: Canary Islands
- Province: Las Palmas
- Island: Lanzarote
- Municipality: Yaiza
- Time zone: UTC+00:00 (WET)
  - Summer (DST): UTC+01:00 (WEST)
- Postcode: 35580

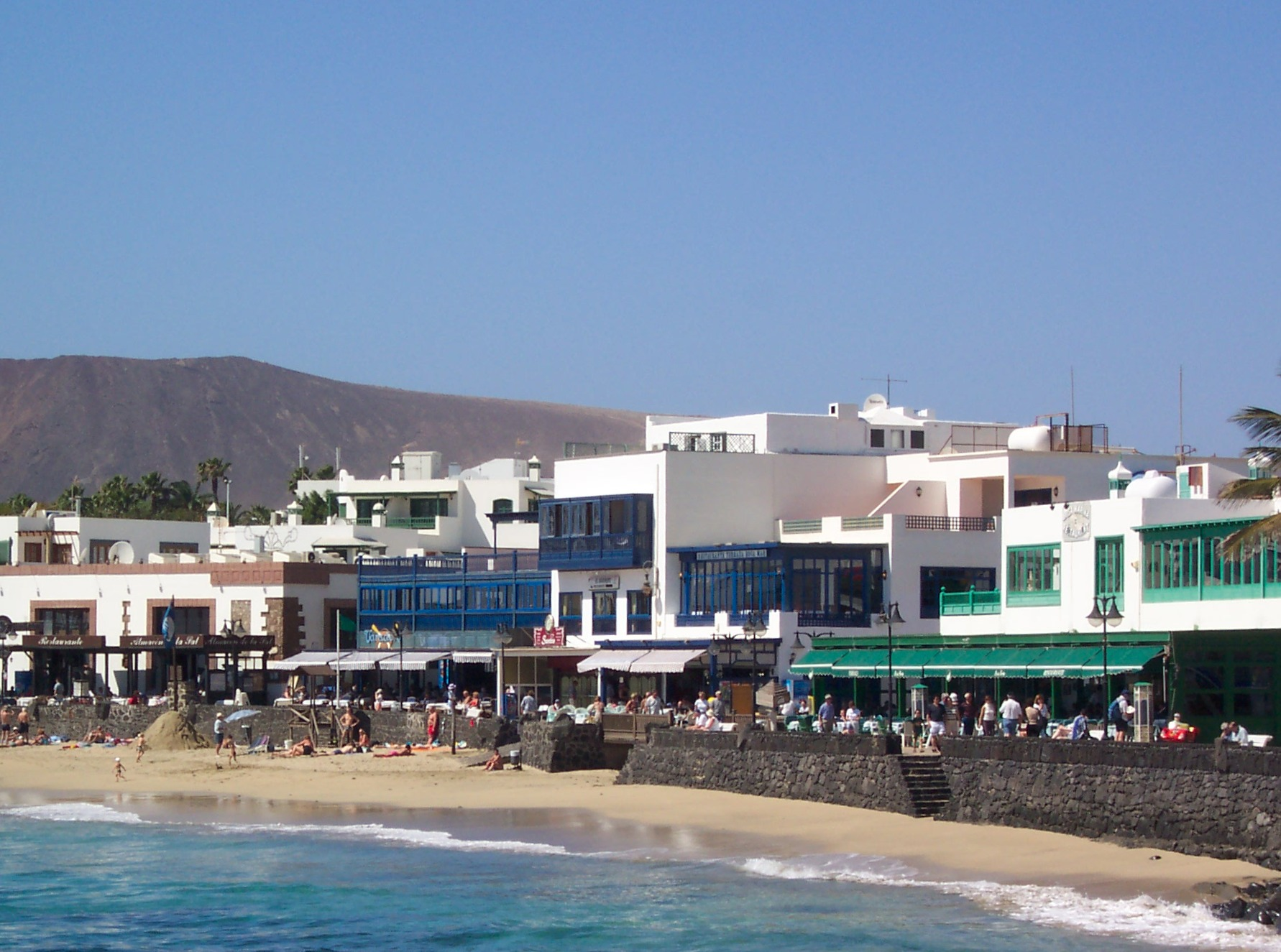
Playa Blanca

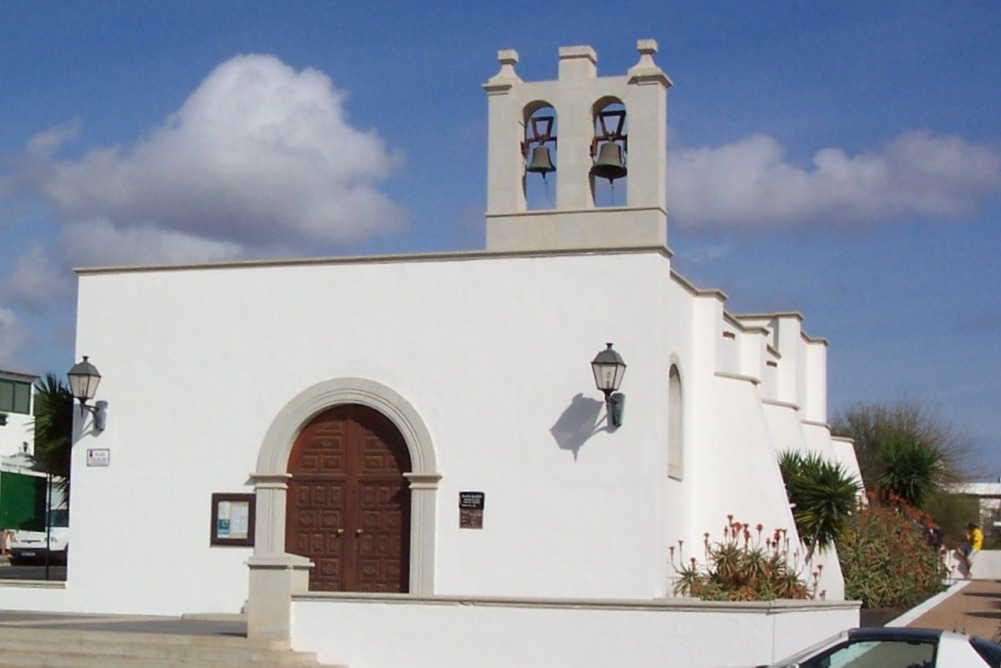
Nuestra Señora del Carmen

Playa Blanca (Spanish for "White Beach") is the southernmost town of the Spanish island of Lanzarote. It is the newest resort on the island, and is part of the municipality of Yaiza. In 2025 Playa Blanca had 14,276 residents.

Approximately a 40-minute drive (45 km) from the airport, it has a state school, a private school (teaching the English educational curriculum), a notary, the bustling Rubicon Marina, church, harbour with ferries to Corralejo on the northern tip of Fuerteventura and an industrial area on the entrance to the town. A public library was opened in April 2012.

The bus and coach station ("Estacion de Guaguas") is the northern edge of the commercial area of the town, at the corner of Av. de las Canarias and Calle los Calamares. Direct or connecting services are available from here to all parts of the island. The building is also the location of the local police station and the local government administration (Ayuntamiento).

In early October 2008, Playa Blanca became the first town on the Island to have a dedicated local bus service, rather than through buses only. The price is a flat-rate €1.30 per journey for an adult, regardless of distance traveled around the town. The route follows a continuous loop from Faro Park in the west of the town, to Las Coloradas in the east. Frequency is every half an hour throughout the day and evening.

The coastline around Playa Blanca is essentially one large 9 kilometre wide bay which is then broken up into three smaller, but still large, bays. From East to west these are Playa Dorada, Playa Blanca and Playa Flamingo. This basic geography means that the beaches in and around Playa Blanca are sheltered and ideal for swimming and sunbathing.

The Atlantic Ocean is to the east, west and south. From the inland edge of the town to the interior, the landscape is level and volcanic. The main road route to Playa Blanca is the LZ2, heading north from the town then eastwards to the capital Arrecife. The second significant road route is the LZ 702 mountain road heading north-east from Playa Blanca via Maciot and Femés, connecting to the LZ72 at an interchange near Uga.

The residents are an eclectic mix of American, British, Canadian, Canarian, German, Irish, and Spanish.

== Marina Rubicon ==
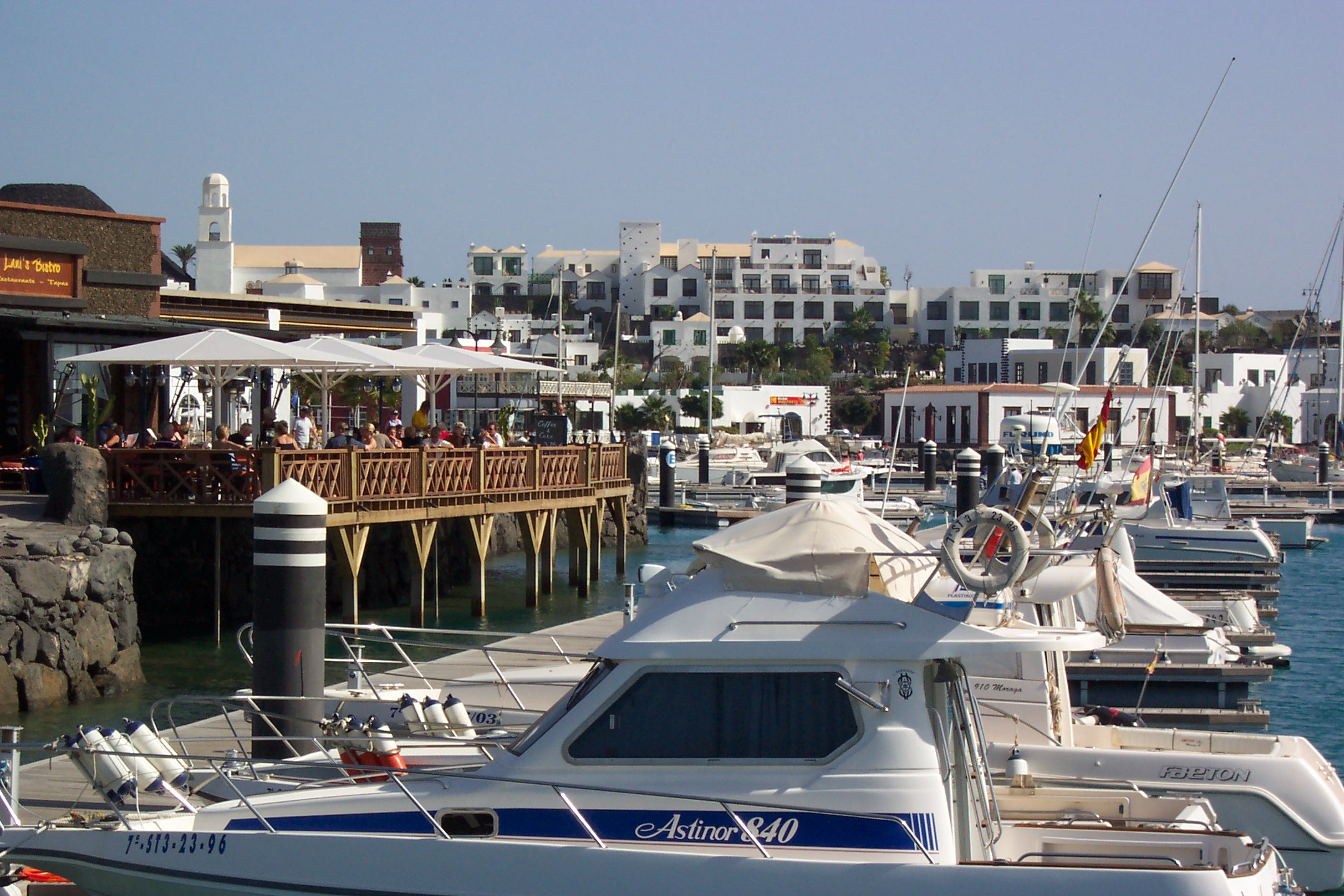
Marina Rubicon

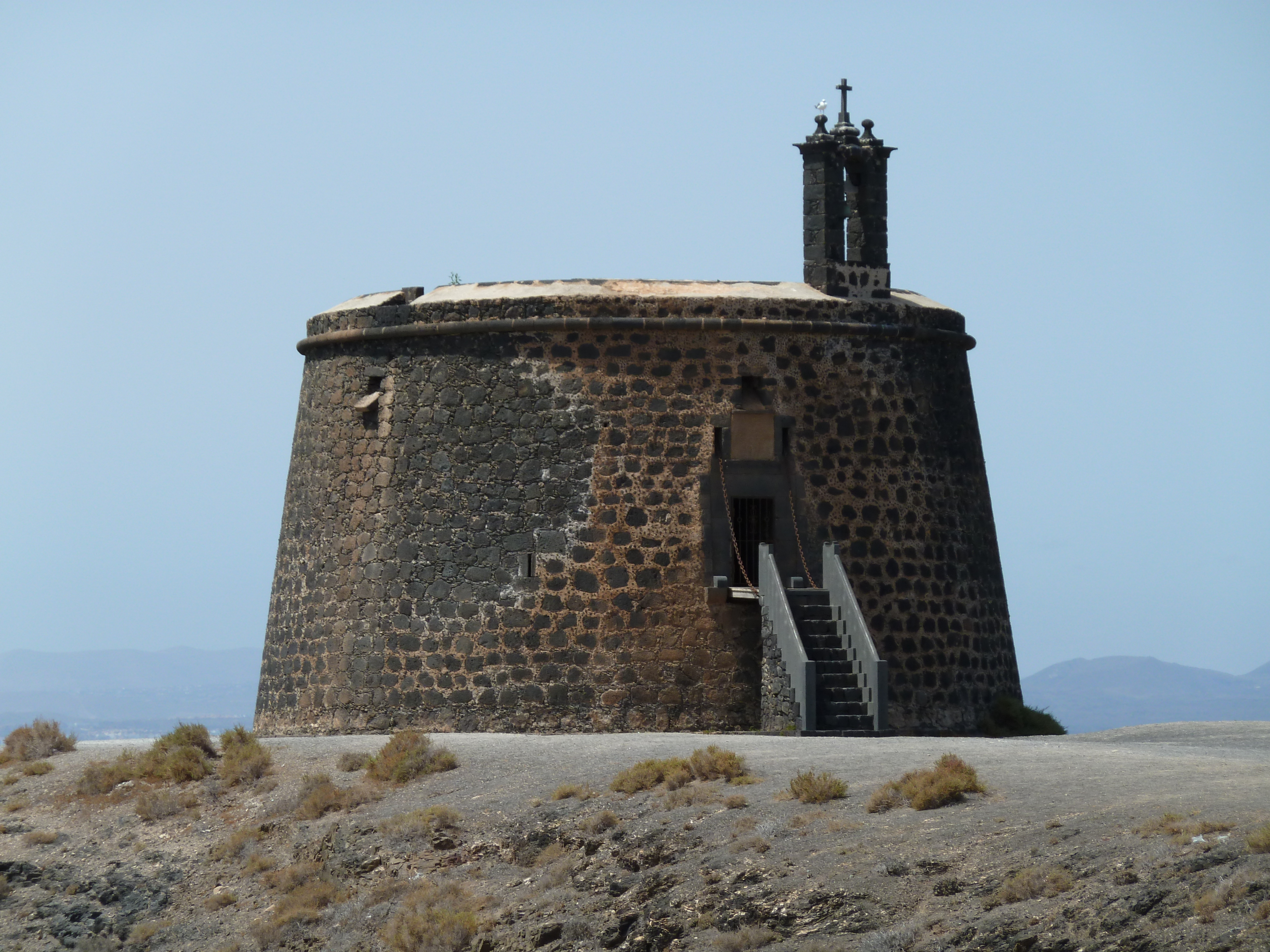
Castillo de las Coloradas

Marina Rubicon, one of the biggest ports on the Canary Islands, is situated about a 15-minute promenade walk from the town itself. It has 550 berths with finger system for monohull and multihull boats of up to 50 meters, in addition to an area for large length on the dock (up to 90 m) and a courtesy dinghy-dock located in anteport. All berths have turrets with water and electricity. The floating boarding pontoons have an aluminium structure, covered in tropical wood and anchored using berthing dolphins. It has markets twice a week, Wednesdays and Saturdays (both in the morning). The goods sold range from handcrafted gifts to local wines.

Two hundred meters to the east of Marina Rubicon, Castillo de las Coloradas stands on the headland of Punta del Aquila. This watchtower was built between 1741 and 1744. It offered good protection through its robust circular construction and through its drawbridge. Its bell was sounded to warn that pirates were approaching the coast.

== The Underwater Museum ==
The Atlantic Museum is an underwater museum located off the coast of Playa Blanca. The museum was designed by British artist Jason deCaires Taylor and opened in 2016. The museum consists of a collection of over 300 life-size sculptures, most of which are located at depths of 12 to 15 meters underneath the water. The sculptures are made from pH-neutral materials that are environmentally friendly and designed to encourage the growth of marine life. The sculptures are spread out over an area of 2500 square meters and are set in a variety of positions and poses, representing scenes from everyday life as well as social and political issues. Some of the sculptures include a woman taking a selfie, a group of people taking a group photo, a man in a suit sitting at a desk with his head buried in the sand, and a group of children holding hands in a circle. The aim of the museum is to create a unique and sustainable way of engaging tourists and locals with the underwater environment and to provide a new habitat for marine life.

By creating an underwater gallery, the museum contributes to the protection and conservation of the marine ecosystem through oceanic art. To access the museum, visitors can take a guided diving or snorkeling tour led by experienced instructors, allowing them to explore the collection of sculptures firsthand. The underwater museum is also visible from a glass-bottom boat, offering a unique perspective for those who do not wish to dive. The Atlantic Museum has received international recognition for its unique concept and innovative approach to marine conservation. It has been featured in numerous publications and is considered one of the top attractions in Lanzarote.

== Beaches ==
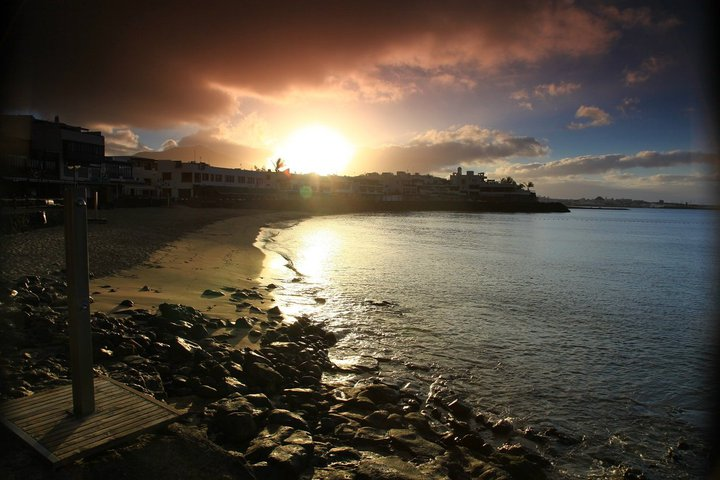
Playa Blanca bay

In the centre of the town is a small beach called Playa Blanca (White Beach). It is a mix of sand and rocks, and is the quietest of the resort's 3 main beaches. There are lifeguards here. In the evening, there are groups practising Canarian Wrestling (children).

Half an hour's walk to the west of the town along the sea-front walkway, is the Playa Flamingo beach. Although it is outside of the town centre, there are still a number of shops and restaurants. This is the nearest sandy beach to the newer developments around Montaña Roja and the lighthouse at Pechiguera, such as Faro Park, Carlos Park and Shangrila Park. Playa Flamingo was virtually destroyed in November 2005, during Tropical Storm Delta. The sea wall was eventually rebuilt in early 2011. There are no lifeguards on this beach.

Playa Dorada is literally translated as The Golden Beach, and is to the east of the town centre. The sea around Playa Dorada is generally very calm because it is encased within a manmade cove. It is a 10-minute walk from the centre of Playa Blanca and is well served by shops and cafes at Centro Comercial Papagayo behind it. This is the most popular beach in Playa Blanca for enjoying water based activities. Banana boats, pedalos and parascending are available here. There are lifeguards on this beach

Perhaps the most well known of all the beaches around Playa Blanca are the Papagayo coves. In reality this is a collection of smaller beaches that are separated by high cliffs, forming a number of sheltered bays. This area has been protected and is now a national park which can be accessed by a rather bumpy dirt road. There is a small fee for all cars entering of €3 (in 2024). The coves can also be accessed on foot, via Los Coloradas. Signs point from next to the Papagayo Arena hotel, traversing over a sandy path down to the first of the coves.

== Ferries to Fuerteventura ==
There are three ferry lines to choose from in which to make the journey. Firstly there is the Fred. Olsen Express ferry, called the 'Bocayna Express' which makes the trip in 20 minutes. The second ferry is the Naviera Armas, called the 'Volcan de Tindaya', which makes 7 daily crossings each way, each one being of 35 minutes duration. The third is the 'Princesa Ico Glass Bottomed Boat'.

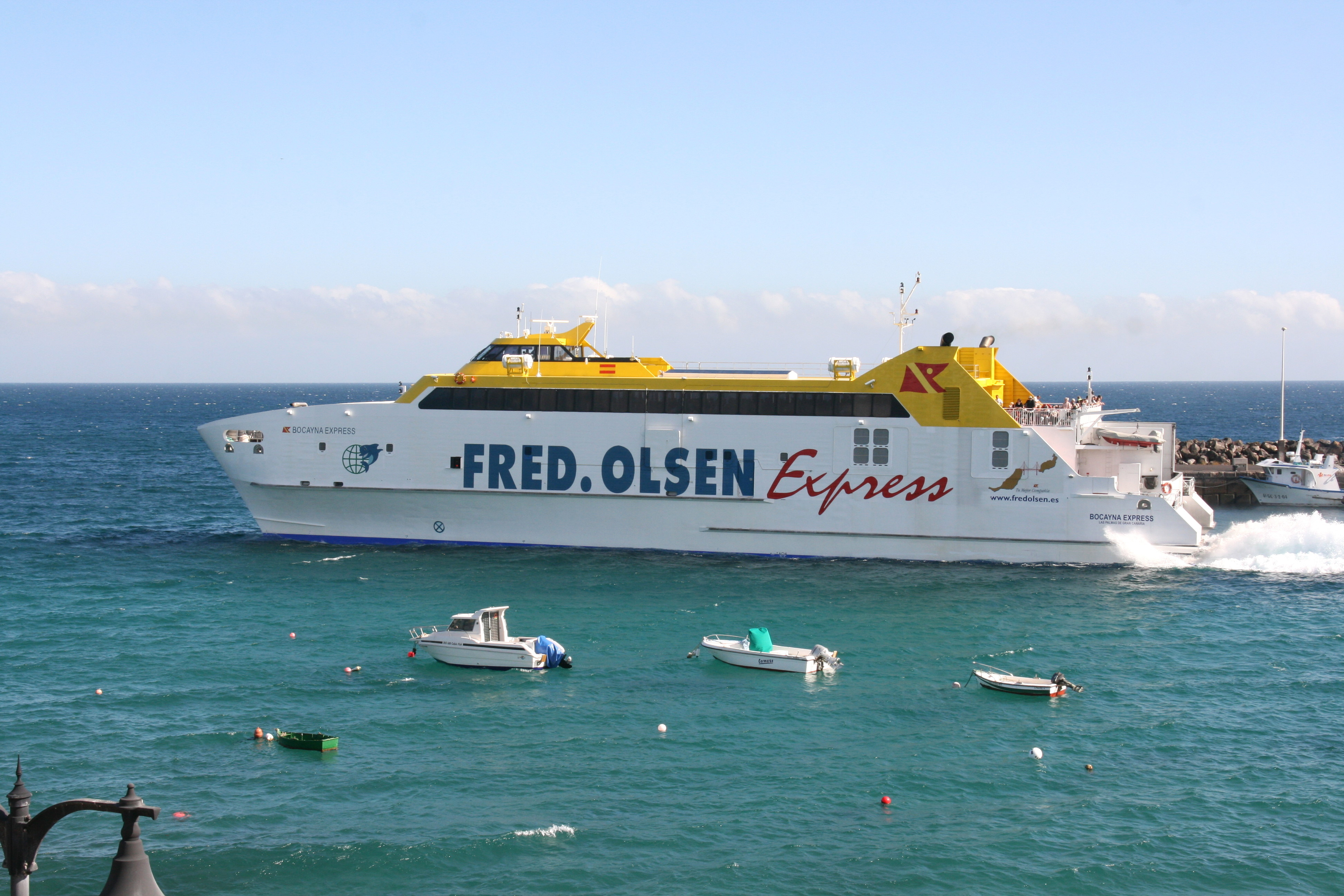

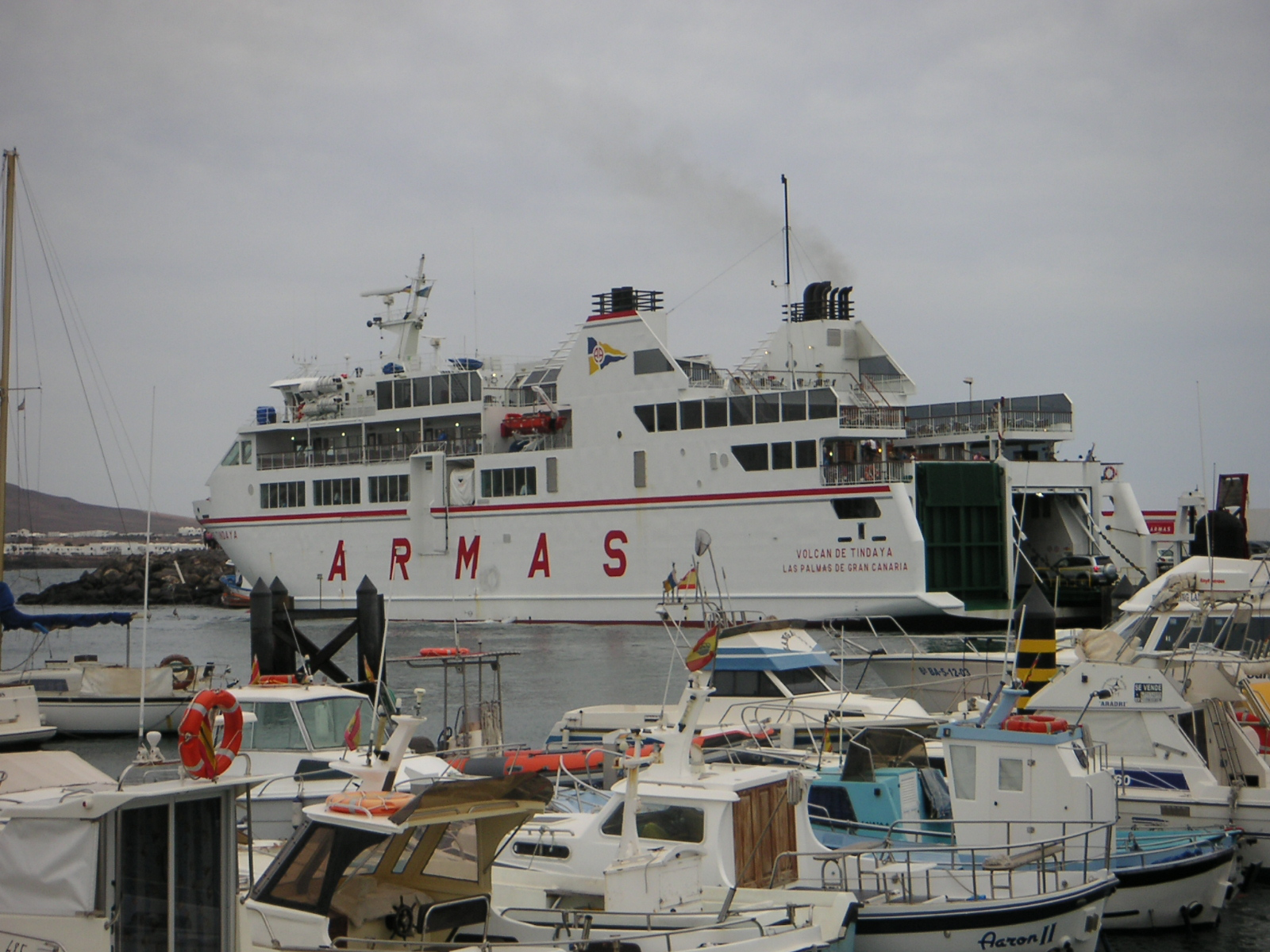

There has been emotive local discussion for some time about enlarging the harbour to allow it to take larger cruise liners such as the Queen Elizabeth 2 which has visited the port, but which had to moor just off the coast.

== Surrounding area ==
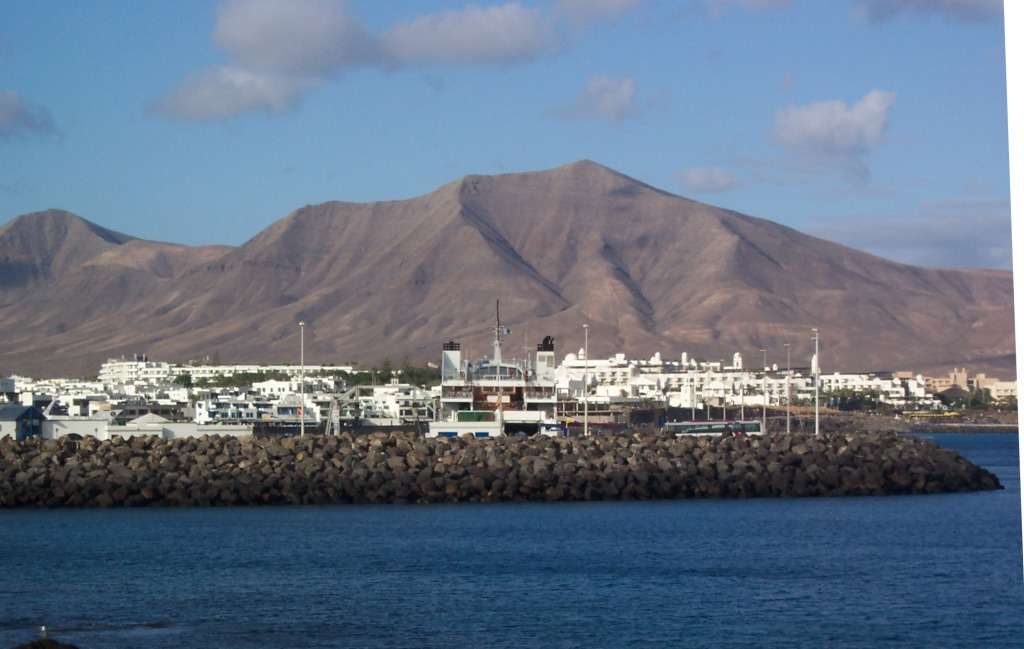
Ajache Grande

Playa Blanca is overlooked by the dormant volcano Montana Roja. The walk up to and around the rim of the mountain is not too difficult and there are views over Playa Blanca, to the North of the island and across to Fuerteventura. Within the crater itself, many people have arranged rocks into names and messages.

To the north and east of Playa Blanca, there is a protected area named Los Ajaches. It is a triangular area of some 3,000 hectares bounded by: the mountain village of Femés, the small coastal fishing village of Playa Quemada and the Papagayo beaches. The highest point is the Ajache Grande (aka Hacha Grande) at 562 metres, which affords views of the whole island and also of Fuerteventura. There are defined paths when entering the area from Femés. The walk to the ridge start from a track to the south-east of Femés. Los Ajaches was declared "Natural space" of the Canaries on June 19, 1987. The volcanic landscape of Los Ajaches has an impressive beauty. It includes areas of scientific interest with the presence of fossils of the Pliocene period.

Just a 20-minute drive north of Playa Blanca is El Golfo. The beach at El Golfo is within a half-submerged cone of a volcano, which over time has been eroded by the sea, leaving behind only the striated wall of the crater. At the foot of the crater wall is Lago Verde, a half-moon-shaped lagoon of a striking green colour, said to be caused by the volcanic minerals and micro-organisms that are believed to be unique in this lake. The beach itself is made of black volcanic pebbles spattered with fragments of the semi-precious olivine. The scenery is further enhanced by the large finger of rock which sits just off the beach and causes the sea to crash around it. This was used as a filming location for the 1966 adventure film One Million Years B.C.

The lagoon is adjacent to El Golfo village, separated only by a steep cliff with loose scree. El Golfo’s fish restaurants are plentiful and serve a selection of fresh fish and meat dishes.

About 8 km north of Playa Blanca is the Laguna de Janubio, a large, saltwater lagoon, location of the Salinas de Janubio, the commercial salt works only still operating on the island. At its height the Salinas produced around 10,000 tons of sea salt per year, with the water originally being pumped into the lagoon by wind power, which has been replaced by electrically driven pumps.

The main part of the salt production was used in the fish industry for preservation and processing but with the invention of the refrigerator, the production decreased considerably and reaches around 2,000 tons per annum today. A small part of the production is still sold as high quality table salt. Each year, during the Corpus Christi festival in June, tons of dyed salt are traditionally used in the creation of magnificent decorations in the streets and squares of Arrecife, the capital.

== Weather ==
The sun shines 300 days per year in Playa Blanca. It is located east of the Canary Islands, closest to Africa, with little rainfall and an average annual temperature of around 21°C.

Because Playa Blanca lacks high mountains, there are few clouds to provide a natural barrier, resulting in lower evaporation and a more manageable humidity level.

Rain is extremely rare, resulting in a dry climate with an average of 16 days of rain per year, most of which falls between December and February.

Lanzarote's coldest month is February, with an average high temperature of 18.2°C and a low temperature of 16.6°C.

The windiest months in Lanzarote are July and August, followed by April and June. In September, the winds usually die down a little. During the summer, daytime temperatures rarely rise above 32°C. Playa Blanca also has little wind because it is protected by a cove.

== See also ==
- List of municipalities in Las Palmas
